= Ukrainian orthography of 1928 =

Orthography of the Ukrainian language

The Ukrainian orthography of 1928 (Ukrainian: Український правопис 1928 року, romanized: Ukrainskyi pravopys 1928 roku), also Kharkiv orthography (Ukrainian: Харківський правопис, romanized: Kharkivskyi pravopys) is the Ukrainian orthography of the Ukrainian language, adopted in 1927 by voting at the All-Ukrainian spelling conference, which took place in the then capital of the Ukrainian SSR, in the city of Kharkiv, with the participation of representatives of Ukrainian lands, which were then part of different states.

Mykola Skrypnyk, the People's Commissar for Education, officially approved the Ukrainian orthography of 1928 on 6 September 1928, which is why this orthography is also called Orthography of Skrypnyk (Ukrainian: Право́пис Скри́пника, romanized: Pravopys Skrypnyka), or Skrypnykivka (Ukrainian: Скрипникі́вка). The main linguist-ideologist of this orthography was Hryhorii Holoskevych, who compiled and published in 1929 the Orthographic Dictionary, which in practice showed all the innovations of the new orthography of 1928, so this orthography is sometimes called Orthography of Holoskevych (Ukrainian: Право́пис Голоске́вича, romanized: Pravopys Holoskevycha). Already on 31 March 1929, it was approved by the Ukrainian Academy of Sciences, and on 29 May by the Shevchenko Scientific Society in Lwów, Republic of Poland. The compilers of the Ukrainian orthography of 1928 were well-known Ukrainian linguists, most of whom were later repressed and their careers destroyed by the Stalinist regime, such as Ahatanhel Krymskyi, Leonid Bulakhovskyi, Olena Kurylo, Oleksa Syniavskyi, Yevhen Tymchenko, Mykola Hrunskyi, Vsevolod Hantsov, Mykola Nakonechnyi, Hryhorii Holoskevych, Borys Tkachenko and others. Members of the spelling commission were such Ukrainian writers as Maik Yohansen, Serhii Yefremov, Mykola Khvyliovyi, Mykhailo Yalovyi and others.

Today, the Ukrainian orthography of 1928 is used by the Ukrainian diaspora in a large part of its publications, the most famous of which is the oldest Ukrainian-language magazine, Svoboda, which is still published. It has been used by some modern Ukrainian authors, literary editors, and Ukrainian linguists, including Iryna Farion, Sviatoslav Karavanskyi, Oleksandr Ponomariv, and Mykola Zubkov, who are the most ardent defenders and propagandists of the Orthography of Kharkiv.

From 2000 to 2013, Ukrainian commercial television network STB TV used certain rules of this spelling together with the draft Ukrainian orthography of 1999 in the news program "Vikna".

The press service of the All-Ukrainian Union "Freedom" uses the rules of Ukrainian orthography of 1928.

== History ==
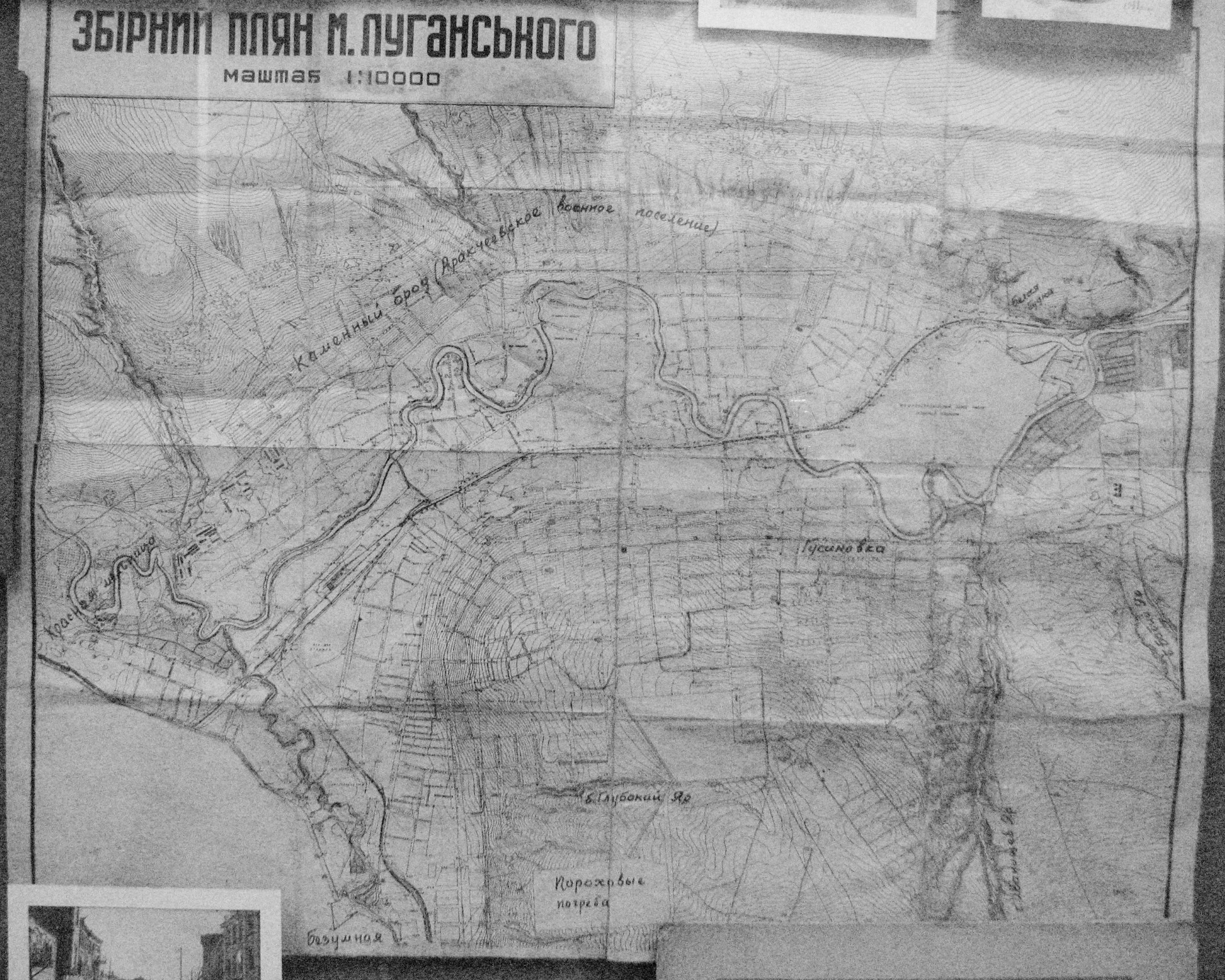
Collective plan of Luhanske. Scale 1: 10000 (Ukrainian: Збірний плян м. Луганського. Маштаб 1:10000, romanized: Zbirnyi plian m. Luhanskoho. Mashtab 1:10000)

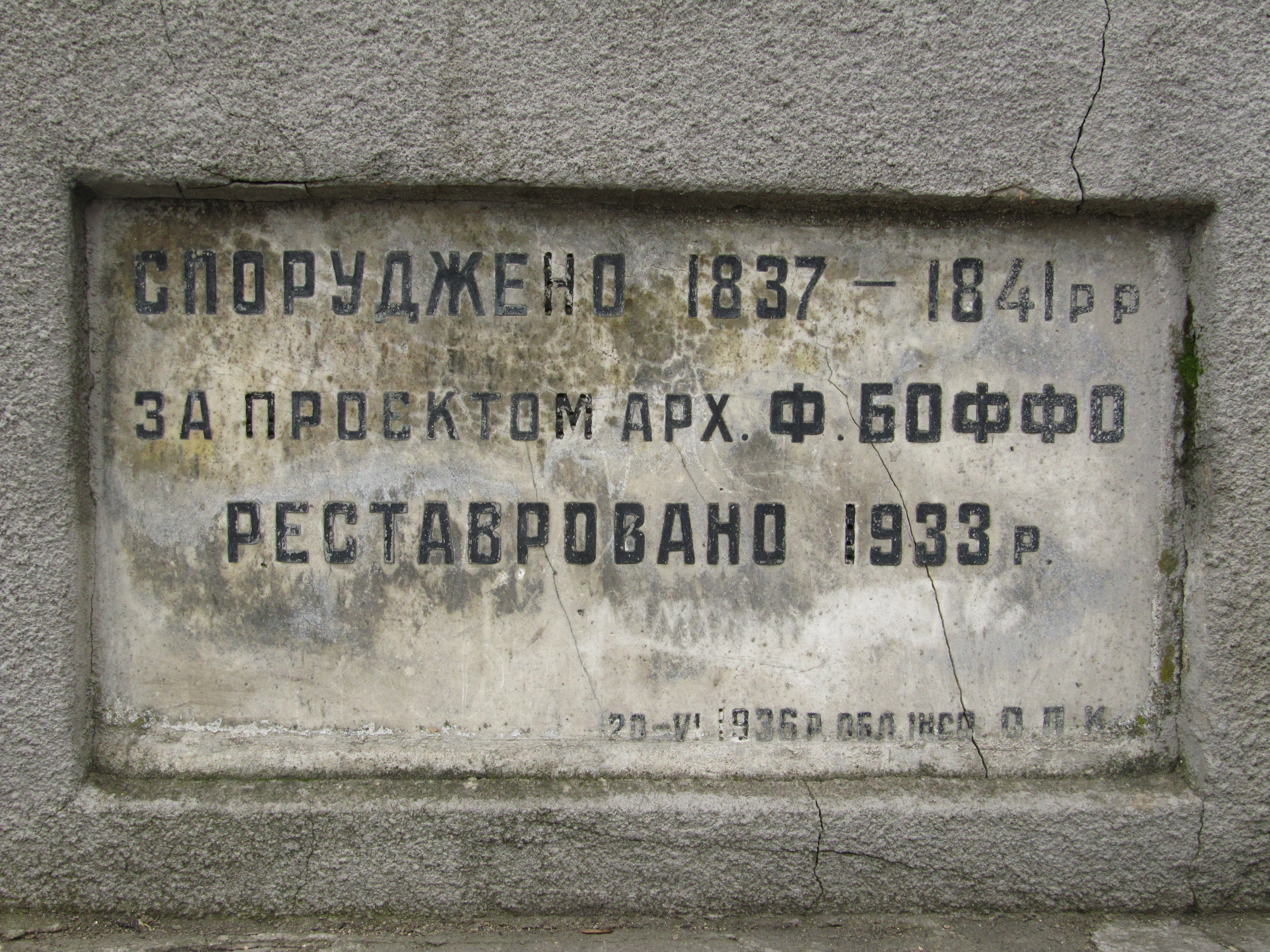
A sign on the Potemkin Stairs in Odesa: "It was built in 1837-1841. according to the project of arch. F. Boffo. Restored in 1933." (Ukrainian: Шильда на Потьомкінських сходах в Одесі: «Споруджено 1837—1841 рр. за проєктом арх. Ф. Боффо. Реставровано 1933 р.», romanized: Shylda na Potiomkinskykh skhodak v Odesi: «Sporudzheno 1837—1841 rr. za projektom arkh. F. Boffo. Restavrovano 1933 r.»)

In 1926, the draft of the Ukrainian orthography was published for discussion (Український правопис (Проєкт). — Харків: ДВУ, 1926). The preface said:

From the state commission at the NGO to streamline the Ukrainian orthography

On 23 July 1925, the Council of People's Commissars of the Ukrainian SSR decided:

"1. To develop rules for spelling the Ukrainian language, organize a State Commission under the People's Commissariat under the chairmanship of the People's Commissar for Education O. Shumskyi from the following persons: Comrade P. Solodub, M. Yavorskyi, A. Krymskyi, O. Syniavskyi, S. Pylypenko, O. Kurylova (Kurylo), Ye. Tymchenko, H. Holoskevych, M. Yohansen, E. Kasianenko, A. Richytskyi, N. Kaliuzhnyi, M. Yalovyi, O. Popov, M. Hrunskyi, V. Hantsov, M. Sulyma, V. Butvyn, V. Koriak, M. Khvyliovyi, S. Yefremov, T. Sekunda, S. Kyrychenko, I. Sokolianskyi and O. Skrypnyk.
2. In its work, the Commission must proceed from modern literary language, which is a synthesis of basic folk dialects, based on "The main rules of Ukrainian spelling of the All-Ukrainian Academy of Sciences", approved by the NGO of the Ukrainian SSR in 1921.
3. In order to attract a wide range of scientific and literary forces to participate in the development of spelling rules of the Ukrainian language, to instruct the People's Commissar to convene a special conference to discuss the draft orthography rules developed by the Commission."

On 1 August of the same year, the People's Commissar convened an organizational meeting of the Commission, which was attended by Comrades O. Shumskyi, V. Butvyn, M. Yohansen, N. Kaliuzhny, Ye. Kasianenko, O. Popiv, A. Richytskyi, O. Syniavskyi, P. Solodub, M. Yalovyi. P. Diatliv and from Kyiv — S. Yefremiv, V. Hantsov, H. Holoskevych, T. Sekunda.

After considering the issue comprehensively, the Commission unanimously acknowledged that it faced a broader task than streamlining the spelling itself, 4 that in general the modern literary Ukrainian language, as a body of state. and public institutions, schools and science, needs a little more "stabilization", more uniformity than that language could acquire in the conditions of pre-revolutionary existence.

Thus, at the organizational meeting it was decided to include in the plan of the work not only purely spelling questions, but also other questions of normalization of literary language, namely it is planned to work out:

1. Orthography of the invariant part of the word (root, suffix, prefix).
2. End of variable words.
3. Orthography of other people's words.
4. Proper names.
5. Punctuation.
6. Grammatical terminology.

In addition, it was decided to organize the Ukrainian alphabet and compile a dictionary of difficult spelling words.

Individual referents — members of the Commission — were instructed to prepare all these sections and review them in special subcommissions, whereby several new members were co-opted into these subcommissions and wished to invite representatives of Western Ukraine to the Commission: Acad. S. Smal-Stotskyi, acad. V. Hnatyuk and Dr. V. Simovych.

Finally, the presidium of the Commission consisting of O. Shumskyi, P. Solodub, A. Krymskyi and O. Syniavskyi was elected. P. Diatlov was appointed Secretary of the Commission.

From 11-21 November 1925, a congress of the Commission (1st plenum) took place in Kharkiv and considered projects: V. Hantsova — Orthography of the invariant part of the word, O. Syniansky — The ending of distinctive words and Punctuation, O. Kurylova — Orthography of other people's words, M. Sulima and M. Nakonechnyi — Proper names. He also reviewed a project of elementary Ukrainian Grammatical Terminology, composed of several projects — M. Yohansen, L. Bulakhovskyi, the Kyiv Commission at the Institute of Scientific Language and M. Hrunskyi.

All sections of the orthography at this plenum of the State Commission have undergone significant changes, amendments and additions.

In its work, the Commission proceeded from the principles of orthography and language standardization and the possible simplification of orthography, so there are no radical changes in the schedule (alphabet and other characters), is not spelled. The commission tried only to precisely formulate the rules of spelling and language in order to eliminate the discrepancy that arises as a result of the struggle in the Ukrainian literary language of different dialects, influences, habits.

The basis for standardization and simplification was the practice and nature of the Ukrainian language: establishing a rule of spelling and language, the Commission tried not to violate without extreme necessity the established tradition, the usual norm, although, of course, all the time looked at the living language in its various dialects and its history.

Having considered all the material, the plenum of the Commission instructed it to be edited by the selected editorial trio — A. Krymskyi, V. Hantsov and O. Syniavskyi.

O. Syniavskyi summarized the material of the Commission, codified it, enclosing it in one continuous adviser, and then (7-13 February 1926 at 12 meetings in Kyiv) an editorial board consisting of the above-mentioned three persons and co-opted H. Holoskevych (who was instructed to compile an orthography dictionary for the adviser at the plenum) reviewed the prepared draft, making editorial amendments and necessary additions in the spirit of the plenary resolutions.

Finally, the draft was last revised at the 2nd Plenum of the Commission in Kharkiv from 5-8 April 1926, where some changes and amendments were again made to the draft in the direction of simplifying orthography. This plenum was chaired by the People's. Commission. Education of O. Shumsky with the participation of the following appointed and co-opted members of the Commission: A. Krymskyi, S. Yefremov, O. Syniavskyi, V. Hantsov. H. Holoskevych, M. Yohansen, M. Sulyma, E. Kasianenko, A. Richntskyi, M. Yalovyi. O. Popov, V. Butvin, M. Khvylovyi, S. Pylypenko, S. Kyrychenko, I. Sokolianskyi, T. Sekunda, N. Kaliuzhnyi, K. Nimchynov, M. Nakonechnyi; L. Bulakhovskyi, F. Kalynovych, V. Demianchuk, B. Tkachenko, M. Hladky, S. Vikul.

This project is being published to acquaint a wide range of people — both philologists and word workers, such as writers, editors, and especially teachers-practitioners.

The Commission requests that attention be sent to the editors. of the magazine "Visty" (Kharkiv, K. Liebknecht Street, 11), where they will be printed 6 in a special supplement, or to the address of the Commission (Kharkiv, Artema Street, 29, room 25).

After 2-3 months of discussion, the 3rd Plenum of the Commission (conference) will convene for final review and approval of the draft.

April, 1926 Among the participants in the All-Ukrainian Spelling Conference held in Kharkiv in 1927 were 4 high-ranking officials of the People's Commissariat, 5 academicians, 28 university professors of linguistics and philology, 8 teachers, 7 journalists and 8 writers. Three representatives of Western Ukraine also took part: Kyrylo Studynskyi, Ilarion Svientsitskyi, Vasyl Simovych.

The conference approved a new spelling code, with the exception of a few rules: this primarily concerned the debatable rules for writing letters to represent the phonemes /l/-/lʲ/ and /ɦ/-/ɡ/, because it was around them that the greatest controversy arose. The conference elected the presidium of the Spelling Commission consisting of 5 people, which in 1928 adopted a compromise decision on the rules of discussion: the Galician and Dnieper traditions of the Ukrainian language were taken into account. This decision, however, was not unequivocally approved by the orthographers. In particular, Ahatangel Krymskyi considered concessions to the Galician orthography to be speculation and political flirtation between Skrypnyk and the Galicians, and the Galician orthography itself was outdated.

The orthography was printed and distributed in 1929 - since then all schools and publishing houses of the Ukrainian SSR were obliged to adhere to it. For the sake of the unity of the Ukrainian literary language, the leadership of the Shevchenko Scientific Society in Lviv decided to adhere to the norms of the new spelling in Galicia.

All further changes in the Ukrainian orthography were developed on behalf of the government by specially created orthographic commissions. In 1933, an orthography commission headed by A. Khvylia (Olinter), which was destroyed by the Stalinist regime in 1938, reworked the Ukrainian Spelling, recognizing the norms of 1927-1928 as "nationalist." On 4 October 1937, a critical article appeared in the newspaper Pravda, according to which the Ukrainian language should be brought closer to Russian.

After that, the Politburo of the Central Committee of the CP (B) U adopted a resolution according to which:

«Consider it necessary to publish in the pages of the newspaper "Communist" a detailed, detailed critique of the distortions and errors made in the "Dictionary", in particular regarding the use of Polish and other foreign words in the Ukrainian language, while to denote new concepts are closer and familiar to Ukrainian folk n words. Instruct the commission to consider all the corrections that will need to be made to the dictionary».

But some norms that were rejected due to their absence in the Russian orthography were returned to the Ukrainian orthography of 2019.

== Differences ==
=== Phonetics and spelling ===
Ukrainian orthography of 1928	Ukrainian orthography of 1933	Ukrainian orthography of 2019
Alphabet
Аа, Бб, Вв, Гг, Ґґ, Дд, Ее, Єє, Жж, Зз, Ии, Іі, Її, Йй, Кк, Лл, Мм, Нн, Оо, Пп, Рр, Сс, Тт, Уу, Фф, Xх, Цц, Чч, Шш, Щщ, Юю, Яя, Ьь. The letter Ґ for distinguishing the phoneme /ɡ/ from /ɦ/ was used in the Peresopnytsia Gospel of the 16th century, in Meletius Smotrytskyi's Grammar (1619); Borys Hrinchenko in the Dictionary of the Ukrainian Language (1907–1909) cites about 300 words with the letter Ґ. Naum Kahanovych believed that the letter Ґ appeared at the beginning of the 20th century and is a "clumsy innovation", which is artificially used only in a dozen words: that the ‘fraternal Russian and Ukrainian alphabets’ will not have the same number of letters (33 and 32, respectively), but Ukraine, as Russia's younger sister and its direct linguistic descendant, must understand such a step."	Аа, Бб, Вв, Гг, Дд, Ее, Єє, Жж, Зз, Ии, Іі, Її, Йй, Кк, Лл, Мм, Нн, Оо, Пп, Рр, Сс, Тт, Уу, Фф, Xх, Цц, Чч, Шш, Щщ, Юю, Яя, Ьь. In 1933, the spelling commission removed the letter Ґ as "bourgeois nationalist sabotage." In 1934, the Commission of the People's Commissariat of Education issued a resolution: "Due to the fact that there are clauses in the state Ukrainian orthography such that their application has politically harmful consequences, to adjust the Ukrainian orthography in the direction of greater specification of the clause on the use of Ґ. Reject the artificial separation of the Ukrainian language from the Russian language in dictionaries and eliminate the nationalist spelling rules that oriented the Ukrainian language to Polish and Czech bourgeois cultures." AndriI Khvylia claimed that the letter Ґ focused Ukrainian on Galician language practice, which is far from the millions of working masses of Soviet Ukraine.	Аа, Бб, Вв, Гг, Ґґ, Дд, Ее, Єє, Жж, Зз, Ии, Іі, Її, Йй, Кк, Лл, Мм, Нн, Оо, Пп, Рр, Сс, Тт, Уу, Фф, Xх, Цц, Чч, Шш, Щщ, Ьь, Юю, Яя. The letter Ґ was renewed in the third edition of the Ukrainian orthography of 1990 to distinguish the phoneme /ɡ/ from /ɦ/ in words of foreign origin.
Nouns on -ть feminine III declension in the genitive singular
§ 25. -и have: b) Feminine nouns of the third declension ending with -ть after the second consonant: 'від ра́дости, зві́сти, до сме́рти, без чве́рти... Also exceptionally: 'до о́сени, без со́ли, кро́ви, любо́ви, Ру́си. This is how these words are presented in the Dictionary edited by Borys Hrinchenko, which is still one of the important measures of Ukrainian vocabulary.	§ 47. -и have: Generic, dative cases have endings -і. Olexander Ponomaiv believed that the ending -и in feminine nouns of the third declension in the genitive case on -ть creates a distinction between the genitive case one hand from the dative and locative. This is how Ukrainian classics wrote: "Поет не боїться від ворога смерти, Бо вільная пісня не може умерти" (Леся Українка).	§ 95. Nouns on -ть after the consonant, as well as words кров, любо́в, о́сінь, сіль, Русь, Білору́сь in the genitive case singular can be acquired as a variant of the ending -и: гідности, незале́жности, ра́дости, сме́рти, че́сти, хоро́брости; кро́ви, любо́ви, о́сени, со́ли, Ру́си́, Білору́си;
The use of the letter И at the beginning of Ukrainian specific and mastered words before the consonants н and р
И or І § 3.: 2. At the beginning of the word и is never written, only і: Іван, іти, іду, ім’я, імення, Ілля, інбар, інжир, і́скра, і́стик, існувати, ́ істота, і́стина, і́нший, і́ноді, і́нколи, і́ній, І́род, etc.; Before the spelling reform of 1927, the classics of Ukrainian literature used и at the beginning of Ukrainian specific and mastered words before the consonants н and р, in contrast to Russian, where ы was never used at the beginning of words.	§ 3. The word is always written і at the beginning: існувати, істина, інший, іноді, інколи, іній, ім'я, Іван, іти, іду, інжир, інститут, індустралізація, etc. И used at the beginning of the corresponding exclamations, onomatopoeias and derivatives thereof, at the beginning of foreign borrowings — common and proper nouns, when in the donor language at the beginning of the word there is a sound close to Ukrainian и: ива, ивилга, идол, Игиатта, ижиця, илець, инакше, инакодумець, инбирець, инде, индик, индута, Индюр, инжир, иній, инколи, иноді, инколи, инший, иноземний, иноземщина, инопланетянин, инородець, иншомовний, ирджок/ирчок, иржа, Исиах, искра, искорник, искроватий, переинакшити, etc.	§ 2. Some words have variants with a vowel и: і́рій and и́рій, і́род and и́род (‘very cruel man’). И we write at the beginning of individual exclamations (ич!), particles (ич який хитрий), verb и́кати and a noun derived from i и́кання. И at the beginning of the word we use in some common and proper nouns derived from Turkic and other languages, according to their pronunciation in these languages: ийбе́н, ир, Ич-оба́, Кім Чен Ин;
Nouns of neuter and feminine gender in the genitive case of the plural ending in -ів (-їв)
Only neuter and feminine nouns: без прислів'їв, подвір'їв, волів (від воло), багнів (і багон), полів (рідко піль), морів, місців (і місць), обличчів (і облич), роздоріжж́ів (і роздоріж), стовпищів (і стовпищ), питаннів (і питань), бабів, хатів (і хат), губів (від губа = labium), розкошів, подорожів, матерів, статтів (і статтей), відповідів (і відповідей), тварів (і тварей), etc.	From parallel forms бабів and баб, відповідів and відповідей, губів and губ, місців and місць, обличчів and облич, питаннів and питань, роздоріжж́ів and роздоріж, статтів and статей, стовпищів and стовпищ, хатів and хат only those closest to the Russian version are left.	Бабів and баб, губів and губ are used, but are not directly mentioned in the spelling.
The ending -у, -ю in the genitive case of city names
§ 20. Orthography of suffixes 23) In the suffixes -исько (-їсько) and -ище (-їще) it is written и (after the vowels ї), and not і, е: хлопчи́сько, огни́сько, станови́сько, гно́їсько, стовпи́ще, гори́ще, etc.	§ 20. 20) In the suffixes -исько (-їсько) and -ище (-їще) it is written и (after the vowels ї), and not і, е: хлопчи́сько, огни́сько, станови́сько, гно́їсько, стовпи́ще, гори́ще, etc. Preference is given to education with a suffix -ище.	§ 32. Orthography of suffixes 10) With suffixes -иськ-(о) (-їськ-(о), -ищ-(е) (-їщ-(е) formed words mainly with emotionally negative coloring from nouns of all kinds, and after the letter to denote the consonant we write и, and to denote the vowel — ї: гної́сько, дівчи́сько, хлопчи́сько; во́гнище, побо́їще.
Nouns on -ть feminine III declension in the genitive singular
§ 81. -ське, -цьке City names end in -ське, -цьке (rather than -ськ, -цьк): Волочиське, Старобільське, Пинське, Зінов’ївське, Луцьке, etc. Declining names such as adjectives: із Старобільського, під Волочиським, etc.	City names end in -ськ, -цьк: Волочиськ, Старобільськ, Пинськ, Зінов’ївськ, Луцьк, etc.	City names end in -ськ, -цьк: Волочиськ, Старобільськ, Пинськ, Зінов’ївськ, Луцьк, etc.
The ending -у, -ю in the genitive case of city names
§ 25. -а (-я) or -у (-ю) Nouns — names of places, regions, rivers, cities, etc. generic singular is used then with -у, -ю (more often), and with -а, -я: з сте́пу, коло лі́су, без лу́гу, до горо́ду, край ста́ву, проти са́ду, майдан́ у я́ру, слі́ду, Сибі́ру, Туркеста́ну, Кавка́зу, Кри́му, До́ну, Ура́лу, Берлі́ну, Ло́ндону, Пари́жу, Ри́му, Нью-Йо́рку, Херсо́ну, but коло бе́рега, до кряжа́, біля горба́, з Ха́ркова, Черні́гова, Ки́єва (cities on -ів), Остра́, Кам’янця, Переми́шля, Жито́мира, Ві́дня.	§ 23. Geographical names mostly have endings -а, -я: Харкова, Пскова, Саратова, Тетерева, Медецна, Тульчина, Козельци, Дінця, Дніпропетрбвська, Херсона, Ленінграда, Берліна, Лондона, Нью-Йорка, Парижа, Донбаса, Казакстана, Урала, Туркгстана, etc. But Сибіру, Криму.	§ 82. 2.1.2. 6) The endings -у (in hard and mixed groups), -ю (in soft group) in the genitive case have the names of settlements (except those specified in paragraph 2.1.1.2 k): Амстерда́му, Го́мелю, Ліверпу́лю, Ло́ндону, Мадри́ду, Пари́жу, Чорно́билю. The ending -у, -ю is present in the compound names of settlements, the second part of which is a noun, which usually has the ending -у in the genitive case: Дави́дового Бро́ду, Зеле́ного Га́ю, Криво́го Ро́гу, Часово́го Я́ру, Широ́кого Ла́ну, etc.
Fixed feminine nouns with numerals: дві, обидві, три, чотири
§ 30. 2. -і (after vowels and ’ -ї) Solid feminine nouns with numerals дві, обидві, три, чотири may have endings -і (how soft), at what г, ґ, к, х before -і changes to з, ц, с, necessarily with such an emphasis as in the genitive singular of that word: дві книзі, три вербі, хаті, руці, три квітці, пісні, чотири норі, etc. But instead of such forms of solid feminine nouns, the c forms are usually used -и, especially after г, ґ, к, х: дві кві́тки, три руки́, кни́ги, чоти́ри бо́чки.	Fixed feminine nouns with the numerals дві, обидві, три, чотири are not mentioned in the orthography, i.e. the forms of the dual as an option have been removed from the orthography.	§ 88. Nominative In the nominative case of the plural, the nouns of the second declension have an ending -и, -і (-ї), -а (-я). Masculine nouns with numerals два, три, чотири have an ending -и, -і (-ї): два хло́пці, три робітники́, чотири слухачі́. However, solid feminine nouns with numerals дві, обидві, три, чотири are not mentioned again in the orthography.
Alternation of prefixes (prepositions) з — с before deaf consonants
§19. Prepositions are never changed in writing before the deaf consonants of the next word: з по́ля, з ха́ти, із тобо́ю, без потре́би, etc. The suffix з- before deaf consonants к, п, т, х changes to с- (іс-): сказа́ти, спита́ти (іспитат́и), стули́ти, схил, схо́дити, etc. Before all other consonants suffix з- (із-) does not change: зба́вити, зве́сти́, зжа́литися, зчарува́ти, зціди́ти, зшива́ти, зсади́ти, зщу́литись, зформува́ти, etc.	Alternation of prefixes (prepositions) з — с before deaf consonants к, п, т, х was extended to the letter ф: сфальшувати, сфотографувати	§31. З- (ІЗ-, ЗІ-): 1. The prefix з- before the letters to denote deaf consonants к, к, п, т, х, к, п, т, х, к, п, т, х, к, п, т, х turns into c-: сказа́ти, спалахну́ти, стовкти́, сфотографува́ти, схили́ти.; Before all other letters we write з (occasionally із): зба́вити, звести́, зжи́тися, ззирну́тися, зсади́ти, зціп́ити, зчепи́ти, зши́ток; ізжо́вкнути, ізно́в, ізсере́дини.
Transliteration of borrowed words
Transliteration of letters l, la, lo and lu
§54. Borrowing L: 1. a) In words of Greek origin, as long borrowed from the soft /l/, are usually transliterated as ла, ло, лу, л, as well as in older borrowings from other languages.; a) ла: List: атла́нти, Атлантійський океан, атла́с, Лакедемон, лаконізм, латинський, обла́тка, паралакса, пла́стика, Платон, пла́тонічний, протопла́зма, сталактит, схола́стика, фабула́, фала́нга, філантропія, фістула́, формула́, хала́т, шарлатан, шкатула́, при чім а завжди після подвоєного л: вілла́, Геллада, Сцілла; b) ло: List: анало́гія, (ло́гіка, катало́г, проло́г, рефлексоло́гія), гело́ти, дипло́м, кілограм, коло́на, коло́нія, коло́с, Ло́ндон, охлократія, піло́т, тало́н, троглодит, ́ філоксера, філо́софія, хло́р, цикло́н, Цікло́пи, при чім о завжди після подвоєного л: Бйонделло́, Льонґфелло́; c) лу: List: лунати́зм, плутокра́тія, Поллу́кс; d) л at the end of the composition: List: адмірал, арсенал, артикул, бал (відзначення, але баль = бенкет), Балкани, бокал, генерал, Далмація, журнал, ідеал, інтернаціонал, капітал, капітул, квартал, меморіял, мінерал, ориґінал, офіціял, офталмоскоп, протокол, професіонал, скандал, скрупул, Стамбул, стимул, талмуд, Тантал, титул, фалд, фалш, февдал, фінал, фурункул, Халдея, etc.; e) The digraph le is sequentially transmitted through ле: List: біле́т, гале́ра, делеґа́т, електри́чний, Каледо́нія, коле́ґа, леґе́нда, ле́кція, Лена́в, Пале́рмо, телегра́ма, холе́ра і т. ін., однак Айхенвальд, Вайнгольд, ляйбґвардія, ляйтмотив, Ляйбніц, Ляйпціґ, Штайнталь, Шляйхер, etc.; f) We do not write ь in English words at the end and before consonants: List: Албіон, біл, бул, булдоґ, Велз, Вілсон, Далтон, гомрул, ґолкіпер, Джон Мілл, Мілтон, Фултон, Чарлз, Шеффілд, etc.; 2. а) In other cases, newer borrowings from Western European languages are transliterated using a soft /lʲ/: a) ля: List: аеропля́н, баля́да, баля́нс, бациля́, буля́, вакуоля́, гіперболя́, ґалянтерія, деклямація, заля, ісля́м, Каля́брія, капеля́, капсуля́, клявіш, кля́са, лябораторія, ля́ва, ля́вн-теніс, ляґуна, ляж, Ля-Манш, Ля́мартін, ля́ндшафт, ля́тифундія, ля́фет, макуля́тура, Маля́ґа, Мон-Блян, новеля́, номенклятура, парлямент, пля́н, плянтація, пля́тина, пля́тформа, пля́ц, пляцкарта, постуля́т, прокля́мація, скаля́, тарантеля́, флякон, фля́мінґо, флянеля, цифербля́т, шкарлятина, шля́фрок; b) льо: List: бальо́н, бальотувати, бльокада, віольончеля, кольо́квіюм, Кольо́мбо, кольорит, льо́зунґ, льокавт, Льокарно, льомбард, пльо́мба, сольо, фабльо́, фльо́ра, фльо́та, шабльо́н; c) лю: List: блю́за, інфлюенца, Лювр, лю́за, лю́па, металю́рґія, Нібелю́нґи, целю́ля, целюльоза, целюльоїд; d) ль at the end of the composition: List: автомобіль, адюльтер, альґебра, Альжір, алькоголь, альфабет, альхемія, асфальт, балькон, бензоль, бінокль, бухгальтер, васаль, вольт, Ґвадальківір, ґвельфи, ґольф, кальвінізм, опаль, п’єдесталь, порталь, Сенеґаль, скальд, фільтр, Цельсій, etc.; Зокрема м’яким л віддаємо чуже l послідовно в комплексах — -лювати, -люція, -ляндія, -ляр, -лярний, -лярія-, -лятор, -ляція, -льний, -льоз, -льоза, -льозний and in all the words derived from them: List: протоколювати, титулювати, революція, Ґренляндія, Естля́ндія, Ляпля́ндія, Ютля́ндія, циркуля́р, канцеля́рія, реґуля́тор, спекуля́ція, капітал́ ьний, скрофульо́з, целюльо́за, компіля́торський, маніпуля́нтка, etc.	$75. Words of foreign origin with L are transmitted: 1. L unsoftened (л, ла, ло, лу): арсенал, артикул, бал (відзначення), інтеграл, інтернаціонал, капітал, вулкан, формула, аероплан, баласт, план, клас, блок, флот, велосипед, колонія, соціологія, металургія, Атлантичний океан, Ла-Манш, Лафарг, Гренландія, Лузітанія.; 2. L softened (ль, ля, льо, лю): автомобіль, асфальт, магістраль, астролябія, полярний, регулатор, ляпiс, пляж, карт- блянш, кльош, алюміній, блюмінг, аншлюс, люфа, революція... Золя, Люксембрг, Фінляндія, Бельт, Тель-ман, Садуль, Базель...; The digraph le is sequentially transmitted through ле: білет, легенда, пленум, лекція, телеграф.., Палермо, Каледонія... In English words at the end and before consonants it is written л, except for the words mastered already with l soft. Therefore: Мелвілл, голкіпер... but: біль, бульдог, Вільсон, etc.	§ 121. The sound /l/ in words of foreign origin is transmitted by hard or soft л, depending on how common a word is in the Ukrainian language: 1) hard л (л, ла, ло, лу) in words: арсена́л, бал, вулка́н, інтегра́л, капіта́л, футбо́л, халва́; аеропла́н, бала́нс, гала́нтний, глазу́р, клас, моле́кула, нове́ла, план, при́мула, фо́рмула; блок, велосипе́д, коло́нія, со́ло, соціоло́гія, флот; блу́за, лу́па, металу́ргія; Алба́нія, Атланти́чний океа́н, Гренла́ндія, Ла-Ма́нш, Ло́ндон, О́сло, Тулу́ за; Вела́скес, Лама́рк, Флобе́р, etc. In the latest borrowings from the English language, the sound /l/ is transliterated as solid л (ланч, сейл, табло́їд, файл, etc.); 2) soft л (ль, ля, льо, лю) in words: автомобі́ль, асфа́льт, бульдо́г, гі́льза, гольф, магістра́ль, педа́ль, та́бель; вакуо́ля, пілю́ля, пляж, поля́рний, регуля́тор; туберкульоз; алюмі́ній, блю́мінг, револю́ція; Аля́ска, Ба́зель, Лю́бек, О́льстер, Фінля́ндія, Ві́льсон, Лі́нкольн, Золя́, Кро́мвель, Лю́тер, Міше́ль, Рафае́ль, etc.
Transliteration of letters g and h
§ 55. Borrowed h transliterate with the letter г, as borrowed g in newer borrowings it should be transliterated through ґ, in borrowings mastered earlier, especially from the Greek language, transliterate г: Англія, газ, газе́та, га́ма, гегемо́нія, гецеало́гія (ло́гіка...), генера́л, геній, геогра́фія (грама́тика, програ́ма, грамофо́н, діягра́ма, гра́фіка, грам, кілогра́м...), Герма́нія, гігіє́на, гімна́зія, гіпс, гра́дус, граф, Гру́зія, гру́па, дифто́нг, егої́зм, організа́ція, педаго́г, Ри́га, траге́дія, фігу́ра, etc. But аґе́нт, аґіта́ція, аґроном, Араґо́нія, бра́внінґ, Брю́ґґе, Гамбурґ, Геґель, гіда́льґо, гуґено́ти, Гюґо́, ґарантія, Ґаро́нна, ґва́рдія, Ґвіне́я, Ґе́ргард, Ґе́те, Ґеттінґен, ґібелі́н, ґірля́нда, ґля́вберова сіль, ґлядія́тор, ґнайс, Ґо́льфштром, Ґрана́да, ґрандіо́зний, Ґріґ, ґу́ма, Ґустав, дириґе́нт, елеґа́нтний, інтеліґе́нт, лінґві́ст, міґра́ція, Чіка́ґо, etc.	§ 76. Foreign sounds h and g are equally transmitted (regardless of pronunciation) with the sign г, example: 1. гармонія, гектар, гумор, гумус, гербарій, горизонт, гіпотеза, гедер, гандбол, гінтерланд., Гартман, Гюго..; 2. авангард, гвардія, генерація, графік, еімнастика, гран- дібзний, гума, грунт, ембарго, гоніометр, агітація, міграція, лінгвістика, агресор, гегемонія... Гаронна, Гете, Гріг, Гренада.; The absence of the letter Ґ in the Ukrainian alphabet had the character of Russification and unification of the languages of the USSR. Modern spelling has returned the use of this letter, but not to new foreign words. The letter ґ conveys a back-tongue closed consonant in the letter: 1. In Ukrainian and in long-borrowed and Ukrainianized words: а́ґрус, ґа́ва, ґа́зда́, ґандж, ґа́нок, ґату́нок, ґвалт, ґе́ґати, ґедзь, ґелґота́ти, ґелґотіти, ґерґелі, ґерґота́ти, ґерґоті́ти, ґи́ ґнути, ґирли́ґа, ґлей, ґніт (in the lamp), ґо́ґель-мо́ґель, ґонт(а), ґрасува́ти, ґра́ти (noun), ґре́чний, ґринджо́ли, ґрунт, ґу́дзик, ґу́ля, ґура́льня, джиґу́н, дзи́ґа, дзи́ґлик, дриґа́ти і дри́ ґати, ремиґа́ти, etc. and in derivatives thereof. 2. In their own names — toponyms of Ukraine: Ґорґа́ни (massif), Ґоро́нда, У́ґля (villages in Transcarpathia), in the surnames of Ukrainians: Ґалаґа́н, Ґалято́вський, Ґе́ник, Ґерза́нич, Ґерда́н, Ґжи́цький, Ґи́ґа, Ґо́ґа, Ґо́йдич, Ґо́нта, Ґри́ґа, Ґудзь, Ґу́ла, Лома́ґа.	§ 122. Sounds /ɡ/, /h/: 1. The sound /ɡ/ and similar sounds denoted by the letter g are usually transmitted by the letter г: аванга́рд, агіта́ція, агре́сор, бло́гер, гва́рдія, генера́л, гламу́р, гра́фік, грог, емба́рго, марке́тинг, мігра́ція; лінгві́стика, негативний, се́рфінг, синаго́га, Гвіне́я, Гольфстри́м, Гренла́ндія, Люксембу́рг, Магоме́т, Фольксва́ген, Чика́го.; 2. In surnames and names of people, the sound /ɡ/ can be transmitted in two ways: by adapting to the sound system of the Ukrainian language by the letter г and by imitating a foreign /ɡ/ by the letter ґ (Верґі́лій, Ґарсі́я, Ге́ґель, Ґео́рґ, Ґе́те, Ґреґуа́р, Ґулліве́р, etc.).; 3. The sound /h/ is mainly transmitted by a letter г: гандбо́л, герба́рій, гі́нді, гіпо́теза, горизо́нт, го́спіс, го́спіталь, гу́мус; Га́рвард, Ге́льсінкі, Гіндуста́н, Ганніба́л, Ге́йне, Гора́цій, Люфтга́нза. Traditionally, in individual words borrowed from European and some Eastern languages /h/, and phonetically similar sounds are transmitted by the letter х: хо́бі, хоке́й, хол, хо́лдинг, брахма́н, джиха́д, моджахе́д, хану́м, харакі́рі, хіджа́б, шахі́д, Алла́х, Ахме́д, Муха́ммед, Сухро́б, Хакі́м, Хаммура́пі, etc.
Transliteration of the letters β ("beta") and θ ("theta") from Greek
§ 57. Greek θ (th) is transliterated through т: алгоритм, анатема, антологія, антропологія, аптека, астма, аритметика, атеїзм, бібліотека, аритметика, етер, катедра, католичний, логаритм, маратон, математика, метода, міт, ортографія, ортоепія, ортодокс, ортопедія, патос, ритм, театр, теорія, теологія; Атени, Атос, Бористен, Демостен, Етіопія, Корінт, Тессалія; Агатангел, Амальтея, Вартоломій, Марта, Методій, Пітагор, Прометей, Тадей, Текля, Теодор, etc. § 58. Greek β in those words that have long passed to us directly from Byzantium, we pass through в: Вавило́н, Васи́ль, Варва́ра, Візанті́я, Віфлеє́м (Jewish), херуви́м, си́мвол, дия́вол, амво́н (and амбо́на); but the words that have come down to us from the West we write them through б: Ара́бія, базилі́ка, бі́блія, бібліоте́ка, база́льт, аляба́стер, Бакх, бакха́нка, бакхана́лія, барбари́зм, ба́рбар, Те́би, Бетлеге́м (in the USA).	§ 57. In foreign words it is written ф (not хв): факт, форма, Фунт, фах, фабрика, фамелія, офіціальний, реформіст, Гаммерфест... It is also written: міф, орфографія, кафедра, логаpифм, ефір, пaфос at ортопедія, ортодокс, театр, теорія. The orthography does not mention the origin of the words at all "міф, орфографія, кафедра, логаpифм, ефір, пaфос", which are served immediately in the Russian manner. There is also no separate rule for Greek β. The Greek β in Belarusian Classical Orthography is sequentially transmitted only through a letter б.	§ 123. Буквосполучення th у словах грецького походження The diphthong th in words of Greek origin is usually transmitted by letter т: алгори́тм, антоло́гія, антрополо́гія, апте́ка, а́стма, бібліоте́ка, католи́цький, матема́тика, мето́д, ритм, теа́тр, теоло́гія, тео́рія, ортодо́кс, ортопе́дія, Амальте́я, Промете́й, Те́кля, Таї́сія, Теодо́р. In words common in the Ukrainian language with ф, spelling variation is allowed, such as: ана́фема and ана́тема, дифіра́мб and дитира́мб, ефі́р and ете́р, ка́федра and кате́дра, логари́фм and логари́тм, міф, міфоло́гія and міт, мітоло́гія, Агата́нгел and Агафа́нгел, Афі́ни and Ате́ни, Борисфе́н and Бористе́н, Демосфе́н and Демосте́н, Ма́рфа and Ма́рта, Фесса́лія and Тесса́лія, etc. Ukrainian classics consistently wrote the sound th through т, not through ф.
Transliteration of the letter w from English
§ 60. English W English w and before vowels are transmitted through в: Вайлд (not Уальд), Вайт (not Уайт), Велз (not Уельс), Вітман (not Уітман), Віклеф (not Уїклеф), Вестмінстер (not Уестмінстер), ват, кіловат, etc.	There is no norm.	§ 124. Letters w, th in words of English origin English w to denote sound /w/ transliterate usually through в: віке́нд, Вашингто́н, Ве́бстер, Веллінгто́н, Ві́льсон, Вінніпе́г, etc. In some words, traditionally through у: Уе́льс, уайт-спірит, etc. Phonetically English W everywhere, without exception, corresponds to Ukrainian В: Вельз, not Уельс, Вол-стріт, not Уолл-стріт, and Ґо́лзверзі, which became Голсуо́рсі.
Transliteration of digraphs ia, ie, iu, io
§ 62. Borrowing і b) After all consonants before vowels and й, at what borrowed ia transliterate through ія, іе through іє, iu through ію (in common nouns), but іо through іо: матерія́л, історія, копія, Азія, соціялізм, спеція́льний, мініятюрний, паліятив, амонія́к, діялект, etc.; авдієнція, гіє́на, кліє́нт, пієтет, Тріє́ст, etc.; трію́мф, тріюмвірат, радіюс, консиліюм, медіюм, but Кіу-Сіу, etc.; ембріо́н, геліотроп, біоскоп, соціологія, аксіо́ма, Онтаріо; критерій, радій, etc. But sometimes the letter і before the vowels is reduced: серйо́зний, курйо́з, бар’є́р, ар’єрґард, кар’є́ра, прем’є́р, п’єдесталь, п’є́са, Ф’ю́ме — see yet § 68	§ 79.: 1. It is always written in foreign words і: b) after all consonants before vowels and й: матеpіал, соціалізм, діалектика, індустріалізація, аудіенція, артеріальний, геніальний, піeтет, кліент, тpіумф, радіус, соціологія, аксіома, партійний, професійний, радій... (and it is always written іа, iе, iy, ea, except for the position at the end of the word, Азія, артерія, премія, партія, iндустрія, ідея). Warning. After vowels in foreign words i transmitted through і (and not through ї): егоізм, Енеіда, прозаік, архаічний, теін, наівний, целулоід... The same: поінформувати, прeісторичний... (after the suffix).	§ 129. Vowel /і/ I. І we write : 2. After a consonant before a vowel and letters є, ї, й: артеріа́льний, геніа́льний, діа́лектика, індустріаліза́ція, матеріа́л, діа́гноз, чіаба́та, ціані́д, соціаліз́м, фіа́лка; авдіє́нція, гіє́на, ріє́лтор, кліє́нт, пієте́т, тамплієр́; копії́ст, аксіо́ма, раціо́н, революціоне́р, соціоло́гія, фіоле́товий; ра́діус, тріу́мф; партій́ний, ра́дій; Біарри́ц, Фіу́ме; Віардо́, Ігле́сіас, Марціа́л, Ліє́па, Оссіа́н, Сіа́м, Шантії́.; At the end of the word foreign -іa is usually passed through -ія: арте́рія, мате́рія, інду́стрія, Іта́лія, Ґарсі́я, Га́ллія.
Transliteration of diphthongs /au/ and /ou/
§ 70. Diphthongs au, ou, eu. We pass the diphthong au and ou through ав (яв) and ов: Авґуст, Австрія, авдит, авдиторія, авдієнція, автограф, аргонавт, гавптвахта, ґлявберова сіль, льока́вт, клявза, кльовн, бравнінґ, павперизм, равт, фавна, Фавст, Гавптман, Павлі, Павльсон, Штравс, Макс Нордав, Австерліц, Гавф, Ґавс, Кавтський, Бічер-Стов, Бернард Шов, etc. We pass the diphthong eu through ев: неврастенія, неврологія, невтральний, невтралітет, etc. But Germen eu through ой: Нойман, Ойтінґ, etc., also Фоєрбах. § 71. German ei The German (and Dutch) diphthong ei in new borrowings is transmitted through ай, after л — яй: Айнштайн, Айхенвальд, Вайнгольд, Гайне, ляйбґвардія, ляйтмотив, Ляйбніц, Ляйпціґ, Швайцарія, Штайнталь, Шляйхер, Фан Вайк, Фан Дайк, Райн, райнвайн, портвай́н, etc.	$82. The diphthongs au and ou are transmitted through ау, оу: аудиторія, аудієнція, гауптвахта, локаут, браунінг, пауперизм, фауна... Гауптман, Паульсон, Штраус, Макс Нордау, Джоуль... But Август, Австрія, автор... § 83. The German (and Dutch) diphthong ei is transmitted through ей: Ейнштейн, Ейхенвальд, Гейне, Лейпціг, Швейцаpiя, Рейн...	§ 131. Digraphs au, ou The diphthongs au and ou are transmitted through ау, оу: аутса́йдер, гауптва́хта, ма́узер; Ка́унас; Кла́ус, Кра́узе, Па́уль, Фа́уст. In words derived from ancient Greek and Latin, the letter au is usually transmitted through ав: автенти́чний, автобіогра́фія, автомобі́ль, а́втор, авторите́т, автохто́н, ла́вра, Авро́ра, Маврита́нія, Павло́. In borrowings from the ancient Greek language, which have a strong tradition of transmitting the letter combination au by transliteration as ау, spelling variants are allowed: аудіє́нція and авдіє́нція, аудито́рія and авдито́рія, лауреа́т and лавреа́т, па́уза and па́вза, фа́уна and фа́вна. § 136. Digraphs ei, eu in words of German origin.: 1. According to the pronunciation, we pass the German letter combination еі in Ukrainian through ай (яй): Айзена́х, Ва́йнрайх, Віттгеншта́йн, Ва́йзенборн, Ка́йзер, Ма́йнгоф, Нортга́йм, Бляйбтрой, Кляйн, Кляйнерт, Фляйшер; digraph eu through ой: фро́йляйн, Нойбра́нденбург, Нойба́уер. Traditionally, in older borrowings, the German letter combination ei is transmitted in transliterated form through ей: кре́йда, кре́йцер, маркше́йдер, капельме́йстер, гросме́йстер, штрейкбре́хер, Ге́йне, Ле́йпциг, Рейн, Швейца́рія.
Transliteration "tr" and "dr"
§ 73. End of words on -ТР, -ДР and -ТЕР, -ДЕР. At the end of foreign borrowed words we write -тр, -др: ареометр, барометр, гігрометр, гексаметр, діяметр, динамометр, термометр, реєстр, семестр, секвестр, теа́тр, центр, пюпі́тр, etc. Although some words (mostly in older borrowings) with -тер, -дер: Олександ́ер, бурміст́ер, маґіст́ер, мініст́ер, цилінд́ер, etc.	§ 84. At the end of foreign words is written -тр, -др: ареометр, барометр, діаметр, термометр, реєстр, теaтp, семестр, центр. The old exceptions are gone: Олександ́ер, бурміст́ер, маґіст́ер, мініст́ер, цилінд́ер. In the Belarusian Classical Orthography these endings are consistently written through -тер and -дер.	§ 127. Final letter combinations -dr, -tr The final -tr is passed through the letters -тр, the final -dr through -др: баро́метр, діа́метр, семе́стр, теа́тр, термо́метр, центр, циліндр.
Transliteration of the initial /h/ in borrowed words
§ 74. Г перед голосними у початку слова In the beginning before, vowels in other people's words usually keep the inspiratory г: гарфа, Геллада, гістерія, гістеричний, гомонім, гієрогліф, гіпохондрія, готель, гумор, гелоти, гагіографія, галябарда, гебраїка, галло, Ганнібаль, Гамількар, Гадріян. But: істо́рія, анга́р, ома́р.	§ 85. H (breath) before vowels at the beginning, usually not spelled: арфа (а не гарфа), Еллада, істерія, іпoxондрія, історія.. at готель, гумор, Ганнібал.	There is no norm.

=== Lexicology ===
Ukrainian orthography of 1928
Ukrainian orthography of 1933
Ukrainian orthography of 2019
Geographical names
Басарабія, Берестя, Білгород, Бердянське, Букарешт, Єйське, Дін, Кахівка, Кремінчук, Луганське, Мелітопіль, Маріюпіль, Мукачів, Прилука, Рівне, Ромен, Ростів, Севастопіль, Симферопіль, Сальське, Таганріг, Тираспіль, Теодосія, Новозибків, Озівське море, Острогозьке, Пинське;
Бессарабія, Брест, Бєлгород, Бердянськ, Бухарест, Єйськ, Дон, Каховка, Кременчук, Луганськ, Мелітополь, Маріуполь, Мукачеве, Прилуки, Ровно, Ромни, Ростов, Севастополь, Симферополь, Сальськ, Таганрог, Тирасполь, Феодосія, Новозибков, Азовське море, Острогозьк, Пінськ;
Бессарабія, Берестя, Бєлгород, Бердянськ, Бухарест, Єйськ, Дон, Каховка, Кременчук, Луганськ, Мелітополь, Маріуполь, Мукачево, Прилуки, Рівне, Ромен, Ростов, Севастополь, Сімферополь, Сальськ, Таганрог, Тирасполь, Феодосія / Теодосія, Новозибків, Азовське or Озівське море, Острогозьк, Пінськ;
Etymology of writing alternating vowels
Випроваджати, голодівка, манастир, мариво, салітра, соняшний, шаравари;
Випроводжати, голодовка, монастир, марево, селітра, сонячний, шаровари;
Випроводжати, голодовка, монастир, марево, селітра, сонячний, шаровари;
Terminology in the fields of knowledge
Великий Віз, городина, садовина, дієйменник, живе срібло, родзинки, стоп, риска;
Велика Ведмедиця, овочі, фрукти, інфінітив, ртуть, ізюм, сплав, тир;

Introduction of new terminology copied from Russian in all fields of knowledge:

Велика Ведмедиця, овочі, фрукти, інфінітив or дієйменник, ртуть, родзинки, сплав, тире or риска;
Borrowed words
Генеза, криза, теза, амнестія, хемія, метода, роля, спіраля, евнух, Европа, епархія, Еспанія, ґолф, мусулманин, носталгія, шелф, евфорія, невтральний, неврологія, авул, богдохан, вермічелі, данець and данський, маштаб, моххамеданин, претенсія, проєкт.
Генезис, кризис, тезис, амністія, хімія, метод, роль, спіраль, євнух, Европа, єпархія, Іспанія, гольф, мусульманин, ностальгія, шельф, ейфорія, нейтральний, нейрологія, аул, богдихан, вермішель, датчанин and датський, масштаб, магометанин, претензія, проект.
Генезис or генеза, криза, теза, амністія, хімія, метод, роль, спіраль, євнух, Європа, єпархія, Іспанія, гольф, мусульманин, ностальгія, шельф, ейфорія, нейтральний, нейрологія, аул, богдихан, вермішель, данець and данський, масштаб, магометанин, претензія, проєкт.

== In the works ==
Representatives of the literature of the "Executed Renaissance" and some of their successors used the Ukrainian orthography of 1928 in their works. As an example, we can cite an excerpt from a poem by Oleh Olzhych "Заходить сонце. Кане тишина...":

Заходить сонце. Кане тишина.

Холоне алябастрова Атена.

Не повернула втомлена луна

Лжепатетичний оклик Демостена.

Vasyl Stus also quite successfully showed in his poems the specific features of the Ukrainian language:

На стільки кривд і стільки правд
одного вороття
замало буде. Чорний дріт
вишивано ухрест.
А вічність вічний творить міт
плачів, хоралів, мес.

Фіялка у степу росла
і непомітна, і мала,
але собою славна...

Ой-йой! Надбігло вже дівча,
фіялочки не поміча,
її маленька ніжка
стоптала фіялковий цвіт,
а та і в смерті шле привіт.

Отам і здобувши останню покуту,
Розпалим, як гроно, нагірний свій біль.
О царство пів серць, пів надій, пів причалів,
Пів замірів царство, пів змаг і пів душ.

Геніяльний поет
роздвоївся (на себе і страх!)
Пів поета роздвоїлося
(на чверть поета і страх).
Чверть поета роздвоїлося
(на осьмуху і страх).
Осьмуха поета роздвоїлася
(на понюху і страх).

Some features of a similar transfer of Ukrainian phonemes are witnessed in the classics of the 19th century:

Ти, брате, любиш Русь,
Як дім, воли, корови,
Я ж не люблю її
З надмірної любови

— Іван Якович Франко

== Current state ==
In the early 1990s, some linguists and politicians called for the restoration of at least some of Kharkiv's orthography. For the first time many books of emigrants were published in Ukraine, and it was in Ukrainian orthography of 1928. Several dictionaries that used this spelling were published without permission. However, of all the proposals, only the restoration of the letter "ґ" was accepted, which in 1933 was declared "nationalist" and removed without any discussion. For some time since 2000, the Ukrainian orthography of 1928 has been used by Channels 1+1, ICTV and Channel 1 of the national radio, and then until 2013 STB used separate rules of this spelling together with the "draft Ukrainian orthography of 1999" in the news program "Vikna". At the same time, the Lviv publishing houses "Litopys", "Misioner", "Svichado", "Zhurnal fizychnykh doslidzhennia", as well as Kyiv's "Sovremennost", "Krytyka" worked according to the key norms of Ukrainian orthography of 1928.

From 2008 to 2020, Ukrainian linguist Professor Oleksandr Ponomariv answered readers' questions every week, using elements of the Ukrainian orthography of 1928.

In 2012, the Russian social network Vkontakte, which is currently banned in Ukraine, founded the «Classic Ukrainian Spelling» community, which actively fought for the return of specific Ukrainian norms. In 2017, community founders Andrii Bondar, Oleksii Deikun and Rostyslav Dziuba translated Vkontakte into the Ukrainian orthography of 1928. Due to the restoration of some norms of the Ukrainian orthography of 1928 in the Ukrainian orthography of 2019", the above-mentioned community was renamed "Language in Time", which is now a popular page of news about the Ukrainian language, its protection and approval.

On 22 May 2019, a new version of the "Ukrainian orthography" was approved, which returned some items of the Ukrainian orthography of 1928, most of which are in a variant form. Naturally, the new orthography has been condemned by some Ukrainian linguists who advocate an officially unapproved draft in the late 1990s and early 2000s. According to Iryna Farion, it is the closest to the Ukrainian orthography of 1928.

== See also ==
- Ukrainian orthography of 1933
- Ukrainian orthography of 2019
- Ukrainian orthography
- Taraškievica (pre-1933 orthography of Belarusian)
