= List of academicians of the National Academy of Sciences of Ukraine =

This is the list of academicians (full members) of the National Academy of Sciences of Ukraine. Bolded names indicate academicians who serve or served as presidents of the academy. Bolded years (years of death) indicate that academicians were elected at their year of death or later.

== 1910 ==
- 14 November 1918 Dmytro Bahaliy (1857–1932) history of Ukraine
- 14 November 1918 **Volodymyr Vernadskyi** (1863–1945) physics and mathematical sciences
- 17 May 1919 Kostiantyn Voblyi (1876–1947) economics, economic geography
- 31 May 1919 Mykola Biliashivskyi (1867–1926) archaeology
- 15 June 1919 Alexander Eichenwald (1864–1944) physics

== 1920 ==
- 1 January 1920 Nicolai Andrusov (1861–1924) geology
- 8 March 1920 Dmitry Grave (1863–1939) mathematics
- ? 1920 **Mykola Vasylenko** (1866–1935) history
- 5 December 1921 Yevhen Votchal (1864–1937) botany, physiology
- 25 June 1923 Oleksiy Huliayev (1863–**1923**) civil law
- 7 April 1924 Volodymyr Hnatiuk (1871–1926) Ukrainian folk Slavistics
- 1 May 1924 Oleksiy Giliarov (1855–1938) philosophy
- 1 May 1924 Mykhailo Hrushevskyi (1866–1934) history of Ukraine
- 9 February 1925 Sergei Bernstein (1880–1968) mathematics
- 9 March 1925 Volodymyr Hordon (1871–1926) civil law
- 6 April 1925 Ivan Horbachevsky (1854–1942) biochemistry
- ? 1925 Ivan Borodin (1847–1930) botany // Russia
- ? 1925 Vladyslav Buzeskul (1858–1931) history
- 22 November 1926 Vladimir Grabar (1865–1956) international law
- ? 1928 Mykola Volkovych (1858–**1928**) pathophysiology
- 29 June 1929 **Aleksandr Bogomolets** (1881–1946) pathophysiology
- 29 June 1929 Nikolai Vavilov (1887–1943) botany // Russia
- 29 June 1929 Mykhailo Vozniak (1881–1954) literary studies
- 29 June 1929 Oleksandr Goldman (1884–1971) experimental physics

== 1930 ==
- ? 1930 Konstantin Gedroits (1872–1932) agrarian chemistry // Russia
- 27 May 1934 Izrail Agol (1891–1937) genetics
- 27 May 1934 Volodymyr Vorobyov (1876–1937) anatomy
- 22 February 1939 Oleksandr Biletsky (1884–1961) literary studies
- 22 February 1939 Oleksandr Brodskyi (1895–1969) physical chemistry
- 22 February 1939 Petr Budnikov (1885–1968) chemistry, silicate technology // Russia
- 22 February 1939 Leonid Bulakhovskyi (1888–1961) linguistics
- 22 February 1939 Eugen Varga (1879–1964) economics // Russia
- 22 February 1939 Heorhiy Vysotskyi (1865–1940) forest and soil studies, geobotany
- 22 February 1939 Mykola Hryshko (1901–1964) genetics, plant breeding

== 1940 ==
- 12 February 1945 Mykola Hudziy (1887–1965) literary studies
- 30 June 1948 Evgeni Babsky (1902–1973) physiology // Russia
- 30 June 1948 Nikolai Barabashov (1894–1971) astronomy
- 30 June 1948 Fedir Beliankin (1892–1972) structural engineering
- 30 June 1948 Nikolay Bogolyubov (1909–1992) mathematical physics
- 30 June 1948 Andriy Vasylenko (1891–1963) machine manufacture, agricultural mechanics
- 30 June 1948 Petro Vlasiuk (1895–1980) physiology of plant nutrition, agrarian soil science
- 30 June 1948 Oleg Vialov (1904–1988) geology
- 30 June 1948 Boris Gnedenko (1912–1995) mathematics // Russia
- 30 June 1948 Leonid Hreben (1888–1980) animal science
- 30 June 1948 Max Gubergriz (1886–1951) therapy

== 1950 ==
- 19 May 1951 Mykola Bazhan (1904–1983) literary studies
- 19 May 1951 Volodymyr Bondarchuk (1905–1993) geology
- 19 May 1951 Ivan Bulankin (1901–1960) biochemistry
- 19 May 1951 Anton Valter (1905–1965) physics
- 23 January 1957 Anatoly Babko (1905–1968) analytical chemistry
- 23 January 1957 Vladimir Belitser (1906–1988) biochemistry
- 23 January 1957 Ivan Bilodid (1906–1981) Ukrainian language
- 23 January 1957 Danila Vorontsov (1886–1965) normal physiology
- 23 January 1957 Maksym Hulyi (1905–2007) animal biochemistry

== 1960 ==
- 18 April 1961 Victor Glushkov (1923–1982) computational mathematics and systems
- 18 April 1961 Viktor Hutyria (1910–1983) crude oil chemistry
- 10 June 1964 Aleksandr Akhiezer (1911–2000) theoretical physics
- 10 June 1964 Vadym Vasylyev (1912–2003) entomology
- 17 December 1965 Volodymyr Arkharov (1907–1997) solid-state physics
- 17 December 1965 Oleksandr Halkin (1914–1982) experimental physics
- 20 December 1967 Oleg Antonov (1906–1984) aircraft manufacture
- 20 December 1967 Vasyl Budnyk (1913–2007) mechanics, machine manufacture
- 20 December 1967 Vitaliy Gridnev (1908–1990) metallurgy, metal studies
- 26 December 1969 Nikolai Amosov (1913–2002) medical surgery
- 26 December 1969 Semion Braude (1911–2003) radio astronomy
- 26 December 1969 Volodymyr Marchenko (1922– ) mathematical physics

== 1970 ==
- 17 March 1972 Vasyl Atroshchenko (1906–1991) chemical engineering
- 17 March 1972 Borys Babiy (1914–1993) history of state and law
- 17 March 1972 Borys Vierkin (1919–1990) physics and low temperature engineering
- 27 December 1973 Oleksandr Alymov (1923– ) industrial economics
- 27 December 1973 Fedir Babychev (1917–2000) organic chemistry, heterocyclic compound
- 27 December 1973 Petro Bahriy (1925–1981) economics
- 2 April 1976 Oleksiy Bohatskyi (1929–1983) organic chemistry
- 2 April 1976 Sergey Gershenzon (1906–1998) molecular biology, genetics
- 23 March 1978 Oleksandr Huz (1939– ) mechanics
- 29 March 1978 Viktor Baryakhtar (1930–2020) solid-state physics
- 29 March 1978 Petro Bohach (1918–1981) physiology, medicine
- 29 March 1978 Oles Honchar (1918–1995) literary studies
- 29 March 1978 Oleksandr Horodyskyi (1930–1992) electrochemistry
- 29 March 1978 Volodymyr Panasiuk (1926– ) materials science, strength of materials
- 26 December 1979 Anatoliy Berezhnoy (1910–1996) chemistry
- 26 December 1979 Mykola Bondar (1920–1994) structural mechanics
- 26 December 1979 Feodosiy Hrynevych (1922–2015) electronic tests
- 26 December 1979 Andriy Hrodzynskyi (1926–1988) plant physiology

== 1980 ==
- 1 April 1982 Mykhailo Brodyn (1931– ) solid-state physics, spectroscopy, optoelectronics
- 1 April 1982 Valeriy Lishko (1937– ) molecular biology, genetics
- 15 January 1988 Serhiy Andronati (1940– ) bioorganic chemistry
- 15 January 1988 Valeriy Beliayev (1931–1999) geophysics
- 15 January 1988 Yuriy Berezansky (1925–2019) differential equation
- 15 January 1988 Dmitriy Volkov (1925–1996) theoretical physics
- 15 January 1988 Yuriy Hleba (1949– ) cellular plant engineering
- 15 January 1988 Valentyn Hryshchenko (1928–2011) cryobiology, cryomedicine
- 15 January 1988 Anatoliy Dolinskyi (1931–2022) thermal engineering
- 15 January 1988 Yuriy Yermolyev (1936– ) mathematical cybernetics

== 1990 ==
- 18 May 1990 Oleksandr Bakayev (1927–2009) economics of Agro-Industrial Complex
- 18 May 1990 Zoya Butenko (1928–2001) experimental oncology
- 18 May 1990 Mykhailo Hasyk (1929–2021) metallurgy of steel and ferro alloys
- 18 May 1990 Mykhailo Holubets (1930–2016) geobotany
- 18 May 1990 Dmytro Hrodzynskyi (1929–2016) radiobiology
- 18 May 1990 Volodymyr Morhun (1938–2025) genetics and breeding
- 18 May 1990 Leonid Pastur (1937– ) mathematics
- 11 April 1991 Oleksandr Vozianov (1938–2018) medical surgery, urology
- 11 April 1991 Serhiy Komisarenko (1943– ) immunology
- 25 November 1992 Lukyan Anatychuk (1937– ) materials science
- 25 November 1992 Mykola Bulhakov (1929–2004) hydrogeology
- 25 November 1992 Anatoliy Vizir (1929–2002) clinical medicine
- 25 November 1992 Sergey Volkov (1935–2016) chemistry
- 25 November 1992 Yevhen Honcharuk (1930–2004) hygiene
- 25 November 1992 Ivan Horban (1928–2000) solid-state physics
- 25 November 1992 Yaroslav Hryhorenko (1927–2022) mechanics
- 25 November 1992 Hanna Yelska (1940– ) molecular biology
- 25 November 1992 Mykola Zhulynskyi (1940– ) Ukrainian literature
- 25 November 1992 Vsevolod Kuntsevych (1929– ) control systems
- 25 November 1992 Leonid Lytvynenko (1938– ) astronomy, radioastronomy
- 14 April 1995 Hryhoriy Verves (1920–2001) Slavic linguistics, foreign Slavic literature
- 14 April 1995 Ivan Vyshnevskyi (1938–2017) nuclear engineering
- 14 April 1995 Valeriy Hayets (1945– ) macroeconomy
- 14 April 1995 Viktor Hrinchenko (1937– ) mechanics
- 14 April 1995 Mykhailo Zghurovskyi (1950– ) computer science, computational systems
- 4 December 1997 Vladyslav Honcharuk (1941– ) chemistry
- 4 December 1997 Volodymyr Horbulin (1939– ) information technology, strategic security
- 4 December 1997 Oleh Kryshtal (1945– ) human and animal physiology
- 4 December 1997 Leonid Lobanov (1940– ) materials science
- 4 December 1997 Dmytro Melnychuk (1943– ) biochemistry
- 4 December 1997 Anton Naumovets (1936– ) surface physics
- 4 December 1997 Oleksiy Onyshchenko (1933– ) culturology
- 20 December 1997 Yakov Belevtsev (1912–**1993**) geology of ore deposits
- ? 1997 Hennadiy Pivniak (1940– ) mining and metallurgical electric power industry

== 2000 ==
- 7 April 2000 Anatoliy Bulat (1947– ) mining engineering
- 7 April 2000 Vasyl Kremen (1947– ) philosophy
- 7 April 2000 Mykhailo Kulyk (1940– ) general power engineering
- 7 April 2000 Ivan Lukovskyi (1935– ) mathematics
- 7 June 2000 Serhiy Pyrozhkov (1948– ) demography
- 16 April 2003 Volodymyr Lytvyn (1956– ) modern history of Ukraine
- 16 May 2003 Oleksandr Amosha (1937– ) economics
- 16 May 2003 Borys Burkinskyi (1942– ) regional economics
- 16 May 2003 Leonid Huberskyi (1941– ) philosophy
- 16 May 2003 Orest Ivasyshyn (1946– ) experimental physics, physics of metals
- 16 May 2003 Oleksandr Konovalenko (1951– ) radioastronomy
- 16 May 2003 Veniamin Kubenko (1938– ) mechanics
- 16 May 2003 Vadym Loktiev (1945– ) theoretical physics, physics of superconductivity
- 16 May 2003 Yuriy Matsevytyi (1934– ) thermal physics
- 16 May 2003 Anatoliy Popov (1937– ) physical and organic chemistry
- 30 April 2004 Ivan Nekliudov (1935– ) radioactive materials science
- 6 May 2006 Pylyp Andon (1938– ) computer science
- 6 May 2006 Volodymyr Azhazha (1931–2009) nuclear engineering
- 6 May 2006 Yaroslav Blium (1956– ) zoology
- 6 May 2006 Borys Bondarenko (1938–2020) thermal engineering
- 6 May 2006 Leonid Bulavin (1945– ) experimental nuclear physics
- 6 May 2006 Valeriy Vorona (1940– ) sociology
- 6 May 2006 Petro Hozhyk (1937–2020) paleontology, stratigraphy
- 6 May 2006 Borys Grynyov (1956– ) materials science
- 6 May 2006 **Anatoliy Zahorodniy** (1951– ) theoretical physics
- 6 May 2006 Oleksandr Kyrylenko (1950– ) power engineering
- 6 May 2006 Viacheslav Koshechko (1946– ) physical chemistry
- 6 May 2006 Valentyn Matveyev (1929– ) mechanics
- 6 May 2006 Zinoviy Nazarchuk (1952– ) materials science, diagnostics of materials
- 6 May 2006 Oleksandr Palahin (1939– ) computer science
- 6 May 2006 Valentyn Pidhorskyi (1937– ) microbiology
- 4 February 2009 Oleksandr Bakay (1938– ) nuclear engineering
- 4 February 2009 Anatoliy Bilous (1951– ) inorganic chemistry
- 4 February 2009 Vadym Bolshakov (1938–2015) metallurgy
- 4 February 2009 Mykola Veselovskyi (1950– ) cell biology
- 4 February 2009 Ihor Voitovych (1932–2014) systems and technologies of information registration
- 4 February 2009 Anatoliy Goltsev (1943– ) cryobiology
- 4 February 2009 Heorhiy Hryhorenko (1939–2019) materials science, electrometallurgy
- 4 February 2009 Bohdan Danylyshyn (1965– ) natural resource economics
- 4 February 2009 Yuriy Izotov (1952– ) astrophysics
- 4 February 2009 Herbert Kamalov (1940– ) physical chemistry
- 4 February 2009 Ella Libanova (1950– ) socioeconomics
- 4 February 2009 Volodymyr Makarov (1941– ) mathematics
- 4 February 2009 Anatoliy Martyniuk (1941– ) mechanics
- 4 February 2009 Stepan Pavliuk (1948– ) ethnology
- 4 February 2009 Hryhoriy Pivtorak (1935– ) Slavic languages
- ? 2009 Mykola Perestiuk (1946– ) mathematical problems in mechanics

== 2010 ==
- 12 May 2010 Nikolai Bagrov (1937–2015) geography
- 12 May 2010 Vadym Lialko (1931– ) geography, remote study of natural resources
- 13 April 2012 Mykola Azarienkov (1951– ) disordered systems
- 13 April 2012 Vil Bakirov (1946– ) sociology, socioeconomics
- 13 April 2012 Oleh Bilorus (1939– ) world economics
- 13 April 2012 Viktor Yehorov (1940– ) ecosystemology
- 13 April 2012 Mykhailo Ilchenko (1941– ) telecommunication systems
- 13 April 2012 Ivan Karnaukhov (1937– ) advanced nuclear systems and technologies
- 13 April 2012 Mykola Kartel (1948– ) chemistry
- 13 April 2012 Oleksandr Kovalyov (1944– ) mathematics
- 13 April 2012 Anatoliy Konverskyi (1948– ) philosophy
- 13 April 2012 Ihor Krivtsun (1954– ) materials science, metal welding
- 13 April 2012 Oleksandr Lukin (1940– ) geology of oil and gas
- 13 April 2012 Ihor Mryhlod (1960– ) liquid state physics
- 13 April 2012 Dmytro Nalyvaiko (1929– ) foreign literature, comparative linguistics
- 13 April 2012 Vyacheslav Petrov (1940– ) materials science, optoelectronic materials
- ? 2012 Dmytro Kiva (1942– ) aircraft manufacturing
- 6 March 2015 Viacheslav Bohdanov (1965– ) mechanics
- 6 March 2015 Valeriy Zadiraka (1941– ) computer technology, information security
- 6 March 2015 Serhiy Kosterin (1950– ) molecular physiology, biochemistry
- 6 March 2015 Anatoliy Morozov (1939– ) physics and mathematics
- 6 March 2015 Oleksandr Ponomarenko (1950– ) isotope geology
- ? 2015 Yevstakhiy Kryzhanivskyi (1948– ) materials science of oil and gas industry
- 7 March 2018 Yakiv Didukh (1948– ) geobotany
- 7 March 2018 Stanislav Dovhyi (1954– ) geodynamics of geological environment
- 7 March 2018 Ihor Yemelianov (1947– ) evolutional ecology
- 7 March 2018 Tetiana Yefymenko (1950– ) economic security
- 7 March 2018 Vitaliy Kalchenko (1948– ) chemistry
- 7 March 2018 Oleksandr Kopylenko (1961– ) law
- 7 March 2018 Roman Kushnir (1954– ) mathematical problems in mechanics
- 7 March 2018 Petro Melezhyk (1950– ) theoretical physics, radiophysics
- 7 March 2018 Vitaliy Pavlishchuk (1956– ) chemistry
- 7 March 2018 Myroslav Pavlyuk (1943– ) geotectonics of oil and gas provinces

== 2020 ==
- 26 May 2021 Serhiy Akhonin (1961– ) materials science, electrometallurgy
- 26 May 2021 Oleksandr Borysenko (1946– ) mathematics
- 26 May 2021 Vitaliy Boyun (1941– ) computer science
- 26 May 2021 Yulian Vysochanskyi (1953– ) applied physics, multiferroics
- 26 May 2021 Ihor Harkusha (1963– ) plasma physics
- 26 May 2021 Roman Hladyshevskyi (1958– ) crystal chemistry
- 26 May 2021 Yuriy Holovach (1957– ) theoretical physics
- 26 May 2021 Andriy Hrytsenko (1948– ) statistics
- 26 May 2021 Svitlana Yermolenko (1937– ) Ukrainian language
- 26 May 2021 Andriy Zharkin (1954– ) power engineering
- 26 May 2021 Oleksandr Ishchenko (1950– ) organic chemistry
- 26 May 2021 Oleksandr Kordiuk (1967– ) experimental physics of quantum materials
- 26 May 2021 Mykola Kuchuk (1958– ) plant biotechnologies
- 26 May 2021 Bohdan Lev (1952– ) theoretical physics
- 26 May 2021 Petro Loboda (1956– ) materials science of refractory compounds
- 26 May 2021 Volodymyr Nazarenko (1956– ) mechanics
- 26 May 2021 Anatoliy Nosovskyi (1954– ) diagnostics and reliance of power producing complexes and objects
- 26 May 2021 Vasyl Pekhnyo (1952– ) inorganic chemistry
- 26 May 2021 Oleh Pylypenko (1961– ) mechanics of rocket and space systems
