= Criterion =

Criterion (pl.: criteria) may refer to:

== General ==
- Criterion, Oregon, a historic unincorporated community in the United States
- Criterion Place, a proposed skyscraper in West Yorkshire, England
- Criterion Restaurant, in London, England
- Criterion Stakes, a horse race in Newmarket, England
- Criterion Summit, a mountain pass in Oregon, United States
- Criterion Wind Project, a wind farm in Maryland, United States

== Science and mathematics ==
- Criteria air contaminants, air pollutants that cause smog, acid rain, and other health hazards
- Criterion validity, in psychometrics, a measure of how well one variable or set of variables predicts an outcome
- Criterion-referenced test, translates a test score into a statement about the behavior to be expected of a person
- Problem of the criterion, in epistemology, an issue regarding the starting point of knowledge

== Publishing ==
- Criterion (journal), the first philosophy journal in Catalan, published from 1925 to 1969
- The Criterion, a British literary magazine published from 1922 to 1939
- The Criterion (American magazine), a New York–based literary magazine published from 1896 to 1905
- Jewish Criterion, a weekly newspaper in Pittsburgh, United States
- The New Criterion, a New York–based monthly literary magazine founded in 1982

== Entertainment ==
- Criteria (band), an indie rock band from Omaha, Nebraska
- Criteria Studios, a recording studio in Miami, Florida
- Criterion Games, a video game developer in Guildford, England
- The Criterion Collection, a company that produces collector's edition DVDs and Blu-ray discs
  - Criterion Closet, a restoration project and film collection
  - Criterion Channel, a streaming service for select films

== Companies ==
- Criteria CaixaCorp, an investment holding company.
- Criterion Capital Partners, a global company which runs the social network Bebo

== See also ==
- Information criterion (disambiguation)
- Criterion Theatre (disambiguation)
- Criterium, bicycle race
- Surat Al-Furqan (The Criterion, The Standard) is the 25th sura of the Qur'an
- Kriterion, a peer-reviewed journal of philosophy
