= Fume =

Fume or fumes may refer to:

== Arts and entertainment ==
- Fifi La Fume, a purple skunks teen character from the animated television series Tiny Toon Adventures
- "Fumes", a song on the album None Shall Pass by Aesop Rock

== Science and technology ==
- Fumes, invisible smoke
- Silica fume, a fine-grain, thin, and very high surface area silica

== Other uses ==
- Fumé (grape) or Sauvignon blanc, a French wine grape
- Fumé, a white wine from Wickham Vineyards

== See also ==
- Fuming (disambiguation)
