= Ukrainian orthography of 1993 =

The Ukrainian orthography of 1993 (Ukrainian: Український правопис 1993 року, romanized: Ukrainskyi pravopys 1993 roku) is the fourth edition of the orthography of the Ukrainian language in 1946 and the first to be adopted during the restored independence of Ukraine. This orthography was in force in 1993-2019, during which the orthography commission did not make any changes to it. However, during its reprint, the publisher made minor edits to some examples to eliminate the discrepancy between spelling and orthography vocabulary.

This orthography expired on May 22, 2019, when the Cabinet of Ministers of Ukraine approved a new version of the orthography developed by the Ukrainian National Commission for Orthography.

== Prerequisites for creation ==
During the First International Congress of Ukrainians (August 27 - September 3, 1991) a resolution was adopted on the need to develop a single modern orthography for Ukrainians living in Ukraine and in the diaspora, which should be based on the entire historical experience of the Ukrainian language.

On June 15, 1994, the Government of Ukraine approved the composition of the Ukrainian National Commission on Orthography under the Cabinet of Ministers. The initial goal was to prepare a new version of the orthography in 2 and a half years (until the end of 1996), but the work on preparing the updated rules was significantly delayed. Finally, all developed proposals were submitted to the Institute of the Ukrainian Language in mid-January 1999. This project is known as the Draft Ukrainian orthography of 1999.

Some Ukrainian publishing houses deviated somewhat from certain rules in writing, for example, borrowed neologisms and foreign proper names. Thus, in many geographical, historical and artistic books, they use transliteration methods (from languages that use the Latin alphabet), without looking at the orthography: "А-Ба-Ба-Га-Ла-Ма-Га" (Kyiv) - in a series books about Harry Potter; "Астролябія" (Lviv) - in a series of works by Tolkien ("The Lord of the Rings", "The Goblin", "Children of Gurin" and "Silmarillion"); "Літопис" (Lviv); "Мапа" (Kyiv) and the encyclopedia "УСЕ" published by "Ірина" (Kyiv), as well as the publishing house "Критика". These editions convey the German h and g in their proper names as г and ґ, respectively. According to the 1993 orthography, "g and h are usually transmitted by the letter г" (§ 87).

== The orthography structure of 1993 ==
Given in accordance with the wording of the 2015 orthography.

I. Orthography the basics of the word

- Letter designations of sounds (§ 1–20)
- Orthography of prefixes (§ 21)
- Orthography of suffixes (§ 22–24)
- Orthography of complex words (§ 25–33)
- Capitalization (§ 34–40)
- Word transfer rules (§ 41–42)
- Emphasis sign (§ 43)

II. Orthography of endings of declension words

- Noun (§ 44–66)
- Adjective (§ 67–69)
- Numeral (§ 70–72)
- Pronoun (§ 73–79)
- Verb (§ 80–85)

III. Orthography of words of foreign origin

- Consonants(§ 86–89)
- Transmission of sound /j/ and vowels (§ 90–91)
- Groups of consonants with vowels (§ 92–99)
- Conjugation of words of foreign origin (§ 100)

IV. Orthography of proper names (surnames)

- Ukrainian surnames, declension of names and surnames (§ 101–105)
- Complex and compound personal names and surnames and adjectives derived from them (§ 106–107)
- Geographical names (§ 108–114)

V. The most important rules of punctuation (§ 115–125)

== Famous people about orthography ==
Linguist, Professor Oleksandra Serbenska consider that the spelling of 1993 had many Russified norms. Dr. Iryna Farion deem that as of June 2017, "the current orthography is a Moscow sundress on the Ukrainian body."

Writer Yurii Vynnychuk: "The whole world uses "Ateny" (ɑtɛnɪ), and we — "Afiny" (ɑfinɪ), as well as Russians… The general opinion of scientists and writers is now: we must return to the spelling of 1928, but modify it according to some changes in the functioning of the Ukrainian language. And finally get rid of the shackles of colonial orthography."

== See also ==
- Ukrainian orthography
- Ukrainian orthography of 1928
- Ukrainian orthography of 2019

== Sources ==
- Ukrainian orthography of 2015
- Ukrainian orthography 1993. Preface. — Chronology of language events in Ukraine: external history of the Ukrainian language
