= Andy van den Dobbelsteen =

- Born: April 11, 1968 (age 58); Tilburg, Netherlands
- Known for: Sustainable urban design, energy transition strategies, climate adaptation
- Title: Full Professor of Climate Design & Sustainability

Academic background
- Education: Delft University of Technology (MSc, PhD)

Andrew Adrianus Joannes Franciscus "Andy" van den Dobbelsteen (born 11 April 1968) is a Dutch engineer, academic, and Full Professor of Climate Design & Sustainability at Delft University of Technology (TU Delft). He served as the Sustainability Coordinator for TU Delft from 2021 to 2025 and is a Principal Investigator at the Amsterdam Institute for Advanced Metropolitan Solutions (AMS Institute).

== Early life and education ==
Van den Dobbelsteen was born in Tilburg, Netherlands and completed his higher education at Delft University of Technology (TU Delft), receiving an M.Sc in Civil Engineering on 25 August 1993. He completed his Ph.D in Technical Sciences at TU Delft on 9 September 2004 with a dissertation titled The Sustainable Office: An Exploration of the Potential for Environmental Improvement of Office Accommodation.

== Academic and professional career ==
=== Academic career ===
At TU Delft, he worked as a part-time tutor, lecturer, and researcher starting in 1993, with his position becoming full-time in 2001 while he conducted his Ph.D research. After finishing that, he became an Assistant Professor in 2004. In 2009, he was appointed Full Professor of Climate Design & Sustainability. His key administrative and leadership roles at TU Delft include serving as Head of the Department of Architectural Engineering and Technology from 2013 to 2018, a Board of Professors Member from 2020 to 2024, the Sustainability Coordinator of TU Delft from 2021 to 2025, and a Faculty Advisor for Solar Decathlon Teams from 2012 to 2022.

In addition to his position at TU Delft, he became a Principal Investigator at the Amsterdam Institute for Advanced Metropolitan Solutions (AMS) in 2014. He has held academic visiting appointments globally, including the Francqui Chair at the University of Antwerp (2016–2017), Distinguished Scholar at the University of Pretoria (2016), and International Visiting Fellow at the Melbourne Sustainable Society Institute (2012).

=== Professional career ===
Van den Dobbelsteen began his career as a researcher and consultant at opMAAT (1993–1996) and served as Head of Division, Quality Manager, and Senior Consultant at the Netherlands Institute for Building Biology and Ecology (NIBE) from 1996 to 2001.

In addition, he writes Dutch-language novels such as Campingsmoking and Jachtseizoen (Brave New Books, 2026) are thrillers by him. He also wrote scripts for short films: Energieslaven/Energy Slaves (2019) and De Klimaatstrijders/The Climate Fighters (2025).

=== Key research projects ===
Van den Dobbelsteen has coordinated and led numerous large-scale European and national Dutch research projects on energy transition, climate adaptation, and sustainable urban design. For the FP7 Smart Cities project City-zen (2014–2020), he served as the lead researcher for TU Delft, developing energy transition strategies and roadmaps for cities like Amsterdam and Dubrovnik. He served as project coordinator on behalf of TU Delft for the NWO Perspective project Sky High (2020–2026). Additionally, he was a work package leader for Climate Proof Cities (2010–2014), assessing climate adaptation measures in Dutch urban areas, and acted as the central coordinator for regional exergy mapping under the Synergy between Regional Planning and Exergy project (SREX, 2006–2011).

=== Advisory and administrative roles ===
Van den Dobbelsteen has served on various advisory boards, governmental committees, and scientific organizations. He became a Board Member of TKI Urban Energy in 2026. He served as a Quality Team Member for the Binnenhof renovation project with the Central Government Real Estate Agency (Rijksvastgoedbedrijf) from 2017 to 2024. From 2015 to 2021, he chaired the Scientific Advisory Committee for NL Greenlabel. Additionally, he was a Board Member for the Dutch Green Building Council (DGBC) from 2008 to 2010 and again from 2017 to 2021, and he acted as the Regional and Joint Coordinator for CIB W116 between 2006 and 2013.

== Awards and honors ==
- Knight in the Order of the Netherlands Lion (Ridder in de Orde van de Nederlandse Leeuw (2018)
- KIVI Academic Society Award, Royal Institute of Engineers (2019)
- edX Online Prize for the Zero-Energy Design MOOC (2020)
- MVO-Manager van het Jaar (Dutch Corporate Social Responsibility Manager of the Year, 2023)
- ABN AMRO Duurzame 50 (Ranked #1 in 2024; #2 in 2021 and 2023)
- Gouden Reiger Awards for short film scripts Energieslaven (2020) and De Klimaatstrijders (2026)
- TU Delft Bronze Coin for supervising over 25 PhD graduates (2025)

== Publications ==
=== Selected Books & Edited Volumes ===
- A. van den Dobbelsteen, A. van Timmeren, & M.J. van Dorst, Eds. Smart Building in a Changing Climate (Technepress, 2009) ISBN 9789085940241
- S. Stremke & A. van den Dobbelsteen, Eds. Sustainable Energy Landscapes: Designing, Planning, and Development (CRC Press, 2012) ISBN 9781439894040
- J. Kristinsson & A. van den Dobbelsteen Integrated Sustainable Design (Delft Digital Press, 2012) ISBN 9789052694085
- V. Yanovshtchinsky, K. Huijbers, & A. van den Dobbelsteen Architectuur als Klimaatmachine (SUN, 1st ed. 2012; Boom, 2nd ed. 2025) ISBN 9789024468867
