= Salzburg Conference for Young Analytic Philosophy =

Salzburg Conference for Young Analytic Philosophy (German: Salzburgiense Concilium Omnibus Philosophis Analyticis, abbreviated SOPhiA) is an annual conference for students and doctoral candidates in philosophy. Since its inception in 2010, the event has been conducted at the Department of Philosophy of the University of Salzburg in Salzburg, Austria. Most of the talks are presented by students and doctoral candidates in philosophy. These are selected by double-blind review. In addition, each conference has featured several keynote speakers, notably Stephan Hartmann, Martin Kusch and Ulla Wessels.

The SOPhiA-conferences have no specific theme and are open to all areas of philosophy. Accordingly, there have been talks on a wide range of topics including epistemology, ethics, Logic, philosophy of mind, philosophy of science and philosophical action theory. However, the arrangers state that there is a "methodical limitation to the tradition of Analytic Philosophy by usage of clear language and comprehensible arguments".

From the beginning SOPhiA has been sponsored by the philosophy journal Kriterion. Other organisation that have sponsored the event include the German Society for Analytic Philosophy, the Austrian Bundesministerium für Wissenschaft und Forschung, as well as the Salzburg state and the city of Salzburg.
