= Eichenwald =

Eichenwald is a surname, which literally means "oak forest" in the German and Yiddish languages. In Russian, the surname is rendered as "Айхенва́льд", which may be transliterated into English as Aikhenvald or Aykhenvald.

Notable people with the surname include:

== Eichenwald ==
- Alexander Eichenwald (1864–1944), Russian physicist
- Dov Eichenwald
- Harry Wald (born Hans Eichenwald; 1924–1996), German-born American holocaust survivor, veteran and casino executive
- Kurt Eichenwald (born 1961), American journalist

== Other spellings ==
- Alexandra Aikhenvald (born 1957), Russian-Australian linguist
- Natalia Shvedova (maiden name Айхенва́льд; 1916–2009), Soviet lexicographer
- Yuly Aykhenvald (1872–1928), Russian Jewish literary critic
