= Ukrainian orthography of 2019 =

The Ukrainian orthography of 2019 (Ukrainian: Український правопис 2019 року, romanized: Ukrainskyi pravopys 2019 roku) is the current version of Ukrainian orthography, prepared by the Ukrainian National Orthography Commission. On 22 May 2019, the Cabinet of Ministers of Ukraine approved a new version of the orthography, and on 30 May 2019, this document came into force.

The composition of the Ukrainian National Commission, which prepared the draft orthography, was approved by the resolution of the Cabinet of Ministers of Ukraine on 17 June 2015.

A transitional phase of 5 years was set to implement the new version. During this stage, each institution was deciding independently on the use of the new version. The Ukrainian Center for Educational Quality Assessment has been set 5 years to implement the new standards in external independent evaluation tests. On May 22, 2024, the transitional period for the full implementation of the new Ukrainian orthography has ended.

The new edition brought back to use some features of the Ukrainian orthography of 1928 (the so-called Orthography of Kharkiv), which were part of the Ukrainian orthographic tradition thrown out by the Ukrainian orthography of 1933, which began the Russification of the Ukrainian orthography tradition. At the same time, the commission was guided by the understanding that the language practices of Ukrainians in the second half of the 20th to the beginning of the 21st centuries have already become part of the Ukrainian orthography tradition.

== Development and implementation ==
The Ministry of Education and Science of Ukraine with reference to the National Academy of Sciences of Ukraine explains that the orthography in the previous edition generally met the needs of society and cannot be considered obsolete. It needed only the elimination of certain contradictions, streamlining, clarification and addition in accordance with the modern language trends that have formed in society. This provision was recognized as fair by a significant part of the participants in the public discussion of the new version of the Ukrainian orthography.

In its work, the Ukrainian National Commission on Orthography was guided by the following principles: the need to preserve the Ukrainian orthography tradition; inclusion of new orthography rules necessary for a sufficiently comprehensive codification of language norms; reflection of the main changes in modern language and writing practice; formation of rules for writing new borrowed words, new proper names; elimination of outdated or inaccurate wording; unification of orthography rules.

A version of the draft, printed electronically on 216 pages, was published by the Ministry of Education and Science of Ukraine on the website for public discussion, which lasted from 15 August to 15 September 2018. On 13 September, the term of public discussion was extended until 1 October. Work on the document was expected to continue at least until the end of 2018; members of the commission declined to comment. However, Maksym Strikha, co-chair of the commission, shared information that the project was approved unanimously.

The orthographic commission stated that

…brings back to life a number of features of the Orthography of Kharkiv, the renewal of which has a scientific basis. Unconditionally sharing the idea of the criminal nature of the repressive actions of the totalitarian regime against the Orthography of Kharkiv and its creators, the orthography commission cannot ignore the fact that the language of the people develops along with its history and the language practice of Ukrainians in the 1930s and 2010s is also part of Ukrainian orthography tradition "and" despite long and intense discussions ... the final vote on the draft of the new edition of the Ukrainian orthography was unanimous.

The public discussion of the draft Ukrainian orthography lasted until 1 October 2018. More than 500 suggestions, comments and remarks were received. On 22 October 2018, the final meeting of the Orthography Commission took place, at which some amendments were made based on the results of the public discussion. On 24 October, at a joint meeting of the Presidium of the NAS of Ukraine and the Board of the MES, the report of the Chairman of the Working Group on drafting the Ukrainian orthography of the corresponding member of the NAS of Ukraine Svitlana Yermolenko "On the new edition of the Ukrainian orthography"; the draft orthography was approved and recommended to be submitted to the Cabinet of Ministers for approval after completion

On 22 May 2019, the Cabinet of Ministers of Ukraine approved a new version of the orthography, and on 30 May 2019, this document entered into force.

On 3 June 2019, the final version was published on the official websites of the Ministry of Education and Science and the National Academy of Sciences. Therefore, as of 3 June, it was recommended to apply the norms and rules of the new edition in all spheres of public life.

A transitional phase of 5 years was set to implement the new version, when each institution decided independently on its use. During this period, the Ukrainian Center for Educational Quality Assessment had to implement the new standards in external independent evaluation tests.

On 5 December 2019, the publishing house Naukova Dumka of the National Academy of Sciences of Ukraine, as an authorized institution, published an authorized edition of the new edition.

On May 22, 2024, the transitional period for the full implementation of the new Ukrainian orthography has ended.

== Major changes to the 1993 orthography ==
The essence of the norm	Orthography of 1993	Orthography of 2019
Words with Latin root -ject	The letter є is written in the word траєкторія; in the words проект, проекція and derivatives is written е.	The sound /j/ is usually transmitted according to the pronunciation of a foreign word by the letter й and in the sound combinations /jɛ/, /ji/, /ju/, /jɑ/ the letters є, ї, ю, я: <...> проє́кт, проє́кція <...>
Sound /j/	І, у (as well as u of the German diphthong eu) in the position between two vowels (in a foreign language) in common names are usually not transmitted by a separate sign <...> but: Гойя, Савойя, Фейєрбах; also майя (nationality), фойє.	The sound /j/ is usually transmitted according to the pronunciation of a foreign word by the letter й and in the sound combinations /jɛ/, /ji/, /ju/, /jɑ/ the letters є, ї, ю, я: бу́єр, конве́єр, пле́єр, фла́єр, круї́з, моза́їка, лоя́льний, парано́я, плея́да, роя́ль, саквоя́ж, секво́я, фая́нс, феєрве́рк, ін’є́кція, проє́кт, проє́кція, суб’є́кт, траєкторія, фоє́, є́ті, Гаї́ті, Го́я, Єйтс, Саво́я, Феєрба́х, Ма́єр, Кає́нна, Іса́я, Йога́нн, Рамбує́, Со́єр, Хая́м, Хеєрда́л, Юно́на.
The ending of nouns on -ть after the consonant, as well as words кров, любов, осінь, сіль, Русь, Білорусь in the genitive singular	—	Nouns on -ть after the consonant, as well as words кров, любо́в, о́сінь, сіль, Русь, Білору́сь in the genitive case singular can be acquired as a variant of the ending -и: гід́ности, незале́жности, ра́дости, сме́рти, че́сти, хоро́брости; кро́ви, любо́ви, о́сени, со́ли, Ру́си́, Білору́си.
Conjugation of female names ending in a labial or soft consonant	—	Female names ending in a labial or soft consonant are declined: Ізабе́ль — Ізабе́лі, Ете́ль — Ете́лі, Жізе́ль — Жізе́лі, Міше́ль — Міше́лі, Ніко́ль — Ніко́лі, Сесі́ль — Сесі́лі, Зейна́б — Зейна́бі, Руф — Ру́фі.
Letter И at the beginning of the word	At the beginning of the word is written І, not И: ім'я́, інди́к, і́ній, і́нколи, і́ноді, і́нший, існува́ти, і́стина.	We write the letter І at the beginning of the word according to the pronunciation: Іва́н, і́грашка, і́дол, і́кати, іко́на, іменува́ти, ім'я́, інди́к, і́ноді, іржа́, існува́ти, і́стина, іти́. Some words have variants with a vowel И: і́рій and и́рій, і́род and и́род (‘very cruel man’). We write И at the beginning of some interjections (ич!), particles (ич який хитрий), verb и́кати and derived a noun и́кання. At the beginning of the word we use the letter И in some common and proper names derived from Turkic and other languages, according to their pronunciation in these languages: ийбен, ир, Ич-оба́, Кім Чен Ин.
Use of the letter ґ in foreign names and surnames where there is a sound /ɡ/	G and h usually transmitted by a letter г: <...> Ганнібал, Гейне, Гете, Гізо, Гомер, Горацій, Горн, Гюго, Магомет.	In surnames and names of people, the sound /ɡ/ can be transmitted in two ways: by adapting to the sound system of the Ukrainian language by the letter г (Вергі́лій, Гарсі́я, Ге́гель, Гео́рг, Ге́те, Грегуа́р, Гулліве́р) and by imitating a foreign /ɡ/ by the letter ґ (Верґі́лій, Ґарсі́я, Ге́ґель, Ґео́рґ, Ґе́те, Ґреґуа́р, Ґулліве́р, etc.).
Digraph th in words of Greek origin	The digraph th, depending on how the word is common in the Ukrainian language, is transmitted by the letter ф: арифметика, ефір, кафедра, логарифм, міф, орфографія, пафос, Федір and by the letter т: бібліотека, ортодокс, ортопедія, театр, теорія; Тадей, Теодор.	The digraph th in words of Greek origin is usually transmitted by letter т: антоло́гія, антрополо́гія, апте́ка, а́стма, бібліоте́ка, католи́цький, теа́тр, тео́рія, ортодо́кс, ортопе́дія, Амальте́я, Промете́й, Те́кля, Таї́сія, Теодо́р. In words common in the Ukrainian language with ф, orthography variation is possible, for example: ана́фема and ана́тема, арифметика and аритметика, дифіра́мб and дитира́мб, ефі́р and ете́р, ка́федра and кате́дра, логари́фм and логари́тм, міф, міфоло́гія and міт, мітоло́гія, орфографія and ортографія, орфоепія and ортоепія, пафос and патос, Агата́нгел and Агафа́нгел, Афі́ни and Ате́ни, Афон and Атос, Борисфе́н and Бористе́н, Варфоломій and Вартоломій, Демосфе́н and Демосте́н, Ефіопія and Етіопія, Коринф and Коринт, Ма́рфа and Ма́рта, Мефодій and Методій, Піфагор and Пітагор, Фесса́лія and Тесса́лія, etc.
Digraphs au, ou	Diphthongs /au/, /ou/ are transmitted mainly through ау, оу: аудиторія, аудієнція, гауптвахта, лауреат, локаут, пауза, фауна (but: мавзолей); джоуль, клоун; Джорджтаун, Каунас; Краузе, Паульсен, Фауст, Штраус; Воуверман, Шоу. However, in a number of words au is transmitted through ав: автентичний, автобіографія, автомобіль, автор, авторитет, автохтон; Австралія, Австрія; Август, Аврора.	Digraphs au, ou to denote diphthongs /au/ /ou/ pass through ау, оу: аутса́йдер, гауптва́хта, ма́узер; Ка́унас; Кла́ус, Кра́узе, Па́уль, Фа́уст. In words derived from ancient Greek and Latin, the letter au is usually passed through ав: автенти́чний, автобіогра́фія, автомобі́ль, а́втор, авторите́т, автохто́н, ла́вра, Авро́ра, Маврита́нія, Павло́. In borrowings from the ancient Greek and Latin languages, which have a strong tradition of transmitting the letter combination aу, orthographic options are possible: ауди́т and авди́т, аудіє́нція and авдіє́нція, аудито́рія and авдито́рія, лауреа́т and лавреа́т, па́упер and па́впер, па́уза and па́вза, кла́уза and кла́вза, фа́уна and фа́вна.
Writing "half" with nouns	Together we write:... d) complex nouns with the first part пів-, напів-, полу-: піва́ркуша, півгоди́ни, півдю́жини, півкарбо́ванця, півко́ло, півмі́сяць, півогірка́, пів'я́блука, напівавтома́т, напівсо́н; полу́кіпок, полу́мисок. Note. Before nouns - proper names пів- is written through a hyphen: пів-Євро́пи, пів-Ки́єва.	Note. The indeclinable numeral пів with the meaning «half» with the following noun, a common or proper name in the form of the genitive singular, is written separately: пів áркуша, пів годúни, пів відрá, пів мíста, пів огіркá, пів óстрова, пів я́блука, пів я́щика, пів я́ми, пів Єврóпи, пів Кúєва, пів Украї́ни. If the пів with the next noun in the form of a nominative case is a single concept and does not express the meaning of half, then we write them together: півáркуш, пíвдень, півзáхист, півкóло, півкýля, півмі́сяць, півóберт, півовáл, півóстрів.
Expanding the list of prefixes with which we write words together	авіа-, авто-, агро-, біо-, вело-, водо-, газо-, геліо-, гео-, гідро-, екзо-, екстра-, електро-, зоо-, ізо-, квазі-, кіно-, космо-, лже-, макро-, мета-, метео-, мікро-, мілі-, моно-, мото-, нео-, палео-, псевдо-, радіо-, рентгено-, соціо-, стерео-, супер-, теле-, термо-, турбо-, фоно-, фото- etc.	абро-, авіа-, авто-, агро-, аеро-, аква-, алко-, арт-, астро-, аудіо-, біо-, боди-, боді- (before the vowel), веб-, геліо-, гео-, гідро-, дендро-, екзо-, еко-, економ-, етно-, євро-, зоо-, ізо-, іно-, квазі-, кібер-, мета-, метео-, моно-, мото-, нарко-, нео-, онко-, палео-, пан-, пара-, поп-, прес-, псевдо-, смарт-, соціо-, теле-, фіто-, фолк- (фольк-), фоно-, etc. Note. If foreign parts are attached to their own name or abbreviation, then put a hyphen between them: пан-Єврóпа, псéвдо-Фáуст; веб-API, псевдо-ФОП.
Writing some complex nouns	Through a hyphen are written:...b) nouns meaning state positions, military, scientific ranks: генера́л-лейтена́нт, контр-адміра́л, прем'є́р-мініĭстр, у́нтер-офіце́р, член-кореспонде́нт, штабс-капіта́н;...2) Complex nouns with the first component віце-, екс-, лейб-, максі-, міді-, міні-, обер-: екс-чемпіо́н, лейб-ме́дик, ма́ксі-спідни́ця, мі́ні-футбо́л, о́бер-ма́йстер.	Together we write:...3) words with the first foreign part, which determines the quantitative manifestation of something (higher than usual, very high, weak, fast, etc.): архі-, архи-, бліц-, гіпер-, екстра-, макро-, максі-, міді-, мікро-, міні-, мульти-, нано-, полі-, преміум-, супер-, топ-, ультра-, флеш-: архіскладнúй, архішахрáй, архидия́кон, бліцновúни, бліцопи́тування, гіперзвýк, гіпермáркет, екстраклáс, макромолéкула, макроеконóміка, максіóдяг, мідіóдяг, мікроорганíзми, мікрохвúлі, мікрочастúнка, мініблóк, мінідúск, мінікомп'ю́тер, мультимільйонéр, нанокомп'ю́тер, наночастúнки, 35 полісахарúди, полімотивáція, преміумкла́с, супермáркет, супермодéль, супермóдний, топмéнеджер, топмодéль, ультразвýк, ультрамодний, флешінтерв'ю.... Note 2. Part of the топ- is not compatible with numerals. Note 3. If such foreign parts are attached to their own name or abbreviation, they are written with a hyphen: Супер-Шмідт, мікро-ЕОМ, міні-ПК, флеш-BIOS; 4) words with the first foreign part анти-, контр-, віце-, екс-, лейб-, обер-, штабс-, унтер-: антивíрус, віцепрем'є́р, віцекóнсул, ексчемпіо́нка, ексмінíстр, експрезидéнт, контрадмірáл, контрудáр, лейбгвардíєць, лейбме́дик, оберма́йстер, оберофіцéр, оберлейтенáнт, оберпрокурóр, штабскапіта́н, унтерофіце́р. Note 1. With proper names and abbreviations of the part анти-, екс- we write with a hyphen : «Анти-Дюринг»; екс-Югославія; анти-АВН, екс-НДР.
Writing websites, social networks, search engines, etc.	—	...: 7. Names of sites, networks, search engines, etc. without a generic word are written in lower case (тві́ттер, гугл); names with a generic word are written in capital letters and in quotation marks (пошуко́ва систе́ма «Гугл», мере́жа «Фейсбу́к», енциклопе́дія «Вікіпе́дія», систе́ми о́бміну повідо́мленнями «Вайбер», «Телеграм»); names of sites used as names of legal entities are written in capital letters and without quotation marks (РНБО ввела санкції проти Яндексу).
Clarification of numerical and alphabetical names of classes, buildings, buildings, post offices, etc.	Through a hyphen are written:... h) letter names of parallel classes in schools: 7-А, 10-В.	Through a hyphen are written:... d) numerical and alphanumeric names of classes, buildings, post offices, etc.: 7-А клас, 10-В клас, буди́нок № 28-Г, кóрпус 3-А; Ки́їв-1.

== Critics ==
Writer Andrii Kokotiukha believes that orthography will make learning the Ukrainian language more difficult: "I am in favor of Ukrainian citizens mastering the Ukrainian language in general. Because half of the population did not follow the norms of the old orthography. And some of those who use the language in everyday life did not know about the existence of norms as such. I will write as I wrote. After all, the new orthography provides for the rules "and so it is possible, and so it is possible." If there is something critical, there are editors, professional broadcasters. In fact, these innovations will repel those who have just started using Ukrainian due to various circumstances. And some carriers will just be ironic, like me."

Writer Maryna Hrymych criticized the feminatives: "I use the masculine gender not because I do not respect women's rights (I am constantly fighting against patriarchal atavisms with artistic words and non-artistic deeds), but because I know what has historically happened in Slavic languages. That in many cases the masculine semantically plays the role of "unisex" and "gender neutral". This is a unique feature of the Ukrainian language. I love it. Sorry who does not agree. Trained linguists will understand me. "

Philologist Andrii Karbivnychyi also spoke sharply against feminists: "This is a kind of savage madness. In a country where half of the population speaks horrible surzhyk, and the other – parody Russian-speaking, some certified idiots, under the guise of an absurd struggle for gender equality, with impunity mutilate the unfortunate-beautiful Ukrainian, all these all these "членкиня, спортовками, мисткинями, and now фізикинями, психологинями and математикинями."

Writer Radii Radutnyi stated that he did not plan to follow the rules of the new orthography.

Volunteer Roman Donik believes that femininities are inappropriate in the document flow of the Armed Forces: "There is a солдат, a сержант and an офіцер. There aren't even any солдатка or офіцерка. And there are no стрільчиха."

Former director of the Ukrainian Center for Educational Quality Assessment Likarchuk Ihor comments on orthography as follows:

I read all this and think: will I personally communicate in the latest or, as Pronya Prokopivna said, "in a fashionable way", like «міністерка», «лікарка», «етер»? I come to the conclusion that it is unlikely to succeed. Because I believe that the return to the orthography of 1919 is not a well-founded decision. And such that on time. Apparently, it's good to have a retro car from 1919. To show off on it once or twice a year at a show. But it is hardly advisable to drive such a retro car every day…

From 16 August to 7 September 2018, during a public discussion of the draft spelling, the Izbornyk website conducted a survey among its users on spelling changes, which, however, is not representative. 3183 respondents filled out an open online questionnaire. Users of the site accepted the changes in spelling coldly (for example, writing the word project through the letter is supported by only 15% of users of the Izbornyk). The only proposal for the spelling project that was supported by the respondents with a significant advantage (74%) was to write names related to religion in capital letters. When asked whether spelling reform is needed, the pros and cons were also roughly divided. A total of 51% believe that reform is needed; of these, only 22% said they needed it immediately, 29% said they needed it, but not on time. Almost half of the respondents said that spelling reform is not needed – 47%.

=== Court appeal ===
In June 2019, the District Administrative Court of Kyiv received a lawsuit to invalidate and cancel the Resolution of the Cabinet of Ministers of Ukraine No. 437 of 22 May 2019 "Issues of Ukrainian orthography". The lawsuit was filed by Dmytro Ilchenko, a senior partner at the Konstanta law firm, on behalf of a seventh-grader and her mother. According to the plaintiffs, the Government, adopting changes to the orthography, went beyond its powers, as the Law of Ukraine "On the Principles of State Language Policy" (unofficially known as the "Kivalov-Kolesnichenko Law") was declared unconstitutional by the Constitutional Court of Ukraine No. 2-r / 2018 from 28 February 2018, and since then the Cabinet of Ministers of Ukraine has not been empowered to establish norms of Ukrainian orthography and the procedure for approving such norms. A similar lawsuit was filed by the NGO "Constitutional state" (lawyer – Rostyslav Kravets).

28 January 2021, the District Administrative Court of Kyiv overturned the Resolution of the Cabinet of Ministers on the transition to a new orthography, however, the decision of the court of first instance was overturned on appeal.

== Opinion of scientists ==
- Candidate of Philological Sciences Olena Brosalina approved the changes:

I really liked that a very wise decision was made: to allow parallel use. Fans will be able to feel free, but not fans will be able to orient themselves, feel the taste of new words, new forms.

- Doctor of Philology Iryna Farion wrote:
  ...long-overdue proposals related to the de-Russification and de-Sovietization of the Ukrainian orthography are half-hearted due to the variant use (інший / инший, Гегель / Геґель, аудиторія / авдиторія, ефір / етер, вікенд / Уельс, Вайнрайх / Гейне, Сідней / Сирія, бюст / б'ю, в кіно / в пальті, незалежності / незалежности), and some remain in the Soviet-Moscow version (матеріальний). Positive innovations (or rather the return of the positive) are small, semi-bold steps that seem to have frightened the authors of the changes themselves (проєкт, дієреза, рієлтор; -ай instead -ей in German borrowings; interpretation of active adjectives; expanding the scope of the exclamatory case). However, variability is, without a doubt, much better than staying specific to codification.
- Associate Professor of the Department of Ukrainian Language and Applied Linguistics of the Taras Shevchenko Institute of Philology Victoria Kolomyitseva:
  I am not in favor of having many exceptions to the rules. Especially - unmotivated. Orthography should be organized in such a way as to help improve people's literacy. And if people are "confused": then something is written through a hyphen, then separately – it does not improve the overall situation and literacy. And people are uncomfortable. Even if it is better than it was, it takes time to adapt. There will still be problems – you need to "relearn".
- Doctor of Philology Oleksandr Ponomariv, in general, approved the direction of change:

Unfortunately, the new version of the Ukrainian Orthography did not achieve everything I wanted, but I support what has been achieved, because these changes at least partially return to our orthography its national face.

- Doctor of Philosophy Arsen Zinchenko:

Ukraine has long had to return to its specific principles in all spheres of life ... I have long been writing my books in a modernized version of the orthography of 1928".

- Associate Professor of Ukrainian Language and Applied Linguistics, Institute of Philology, Taras Shevchenko National University of Kyiv Serhii Riznyk criticized the variability:

Orthography is a code of language laws and norms. If it is not clear and strict, but allows the use of alternative forms of words, it can undermine respect for other laws that no longer regulate linguistic norms, but legal or social. Perhaps it would be worthwhile to involve a wider range of specialists in the discussion of certain orthography problems and eventually adopt those options for writing words that are more in line with the natural features of the language and, according to experts, have better prospects for perception by most speakers.

- Oleksandr Skopnenko, an employee of the OO Potebny Institute of Linguistics of the National Academy of Sciences of Ukraine and a candidate of philological sciences, explained the main changes as follows: Secondly, the new version of the orthography should codify and return to active use the rules that have long existed in the Ukrainian language.
- Mykola Stepanenko, Doctor of Philology:
  We say that the Ukrainian tradition was most consistently reflected in the orthography of 1928 — "Skrypnykivka" or "Orthography of Kharkiv", then some norms of the 28th year were returned here. It is clear that not all, although there were hopes for a greater entry of what once was, the return of these traditions.
- Doctor of Philology Anatolii Tkachenko has a positive attitude to the use of the letter "ґ" in the transliteration of surnames (Геґель), at least Western figures, as well as a reproduction of the German diphthong «ei» like «ай» (Ваймар, Ляйпціґ, Гайнріх Гайне).
- Candidate of Philological Sciences Yuriy Shevchuk believed that the reform still leaves the Ukrainian language in the field of Russification:

The draft actually continues the Soviet policy of shaking the Ukrainian language from within, likening it to Russian not in everything, but on a number of important points. The draft too often reveals its pro-Russian essence.

== Publications of the draft and the approved orthography variant ==
=== Draft publications ===
- Ukrainian orthography: draft (for discussion) / Prepared by the working group of the Ukrainian National Commission on Orthography. — No source data. — 216 pages. (Published on August 22, 2018.)
- Ukrainian orthography: draft (for discussion) / Prepared by the working group of the Ukrainian National Commission on Orthography. — No source data. — 216 pages. (Published on August 15, 2018.)
- On the website of the Ministry of Education and Science of Ukraine.

=== Publications of the approved orthography variant ===
- The text of the official publication on the website of the Potebnia Institute of Linguistics of the National Academy of Sciences of Ukraine.
- Є. І. Мазніченко; В. Є. Македон; С. В. Шарабанова; І. Л. Яловнича (2019). Український правопис (PDF) (in Ukrainian). Kyiv: Naukova Dumka. ISBN 978-966-00-1728-3. OL 39479295M. Wikidata Q113125993. Archived (PDF) from the original on September 4, 2022. On the website of the Ministry of Education and Science of Ukraine.

== See also ==
- Russification of Ukraine
- Ukrainian orthography of 1928
- Ukrainian orthography of 1933
