= Heliotrope (color) =

Colour

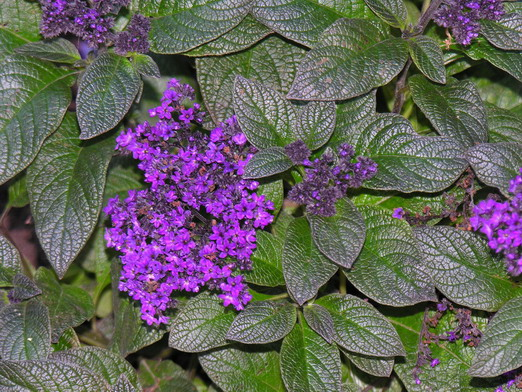
- Heliotrope flowers

Color coordinates
- Hex triplet: #DF73FF
- sRGB^{B} (r, g, b): (223, 115, 255)
- HSV (h, s, v): (286°, 55%, 100%)
- CIELCh_{uv} (L, C, h): (66, 102, 295°)
- Source: Maerz and Paul
- ISCC–NBS descriptor: Vivid purple
- B: Normalized to [0–255] (byte)

Heliotrope is a pink-purple tint that is a representation of the colour of the heliotrope flower.

The first recorded use of heliotrope as a color name in English was in 1882.

== Variations ==
=== Heliotrope gray ===
Heliotrope Gray

Color coordinates
- Hex triplet: #AA98A9
- sRGB^{B} (r, g, b): (170, 152, 169)
- HSV (h, s, v): (303°, 11%, 67%)
- CIELCh_{uv} (L, C, h): (65, 14, 310°)
- Source: ISCC-NBS
- ISCC–NBS descriptor: Pale purple
- B: Normalized to [0–255] (byte)

The color heliotrope gray is displayed at right. The first recorded use of heliotrope gray as a colour name in English was in 1912.

=== Heliotrope magenta ===
Heliotrope Magenta

Color coordinates
- Hex triplet: #AA00BB
- sRGB^{B} (r, g, b): (170, 0, 187)
- HSV (h, s, v): (295°, 100%, 73%)
- CIELCh_{uv} (L, C, h): (41, 99, 300°)
- ISCC–NBS descriptor: Vivid purple
- B: Normalized to [0–255] (byte)

=== Old heliotrope ===
Old Heliotrope

Color coordinates
- Hex triplet: #563C5C
- sRGB^{B} (r, g, b): (86, 60, 92)
- HSV (h, s, v): (289°, 35%, 36%)
- CIELCh_{uv} (L, C, h): (29, 23, 299°)
- Source: Maerz and Paul
- ISCC–NBS descriptor: Dark purple
- B: Normalized to [0–255] (byte)

At right is displayed the colour old heliotrope.

Another name for this colour is old helio.

The first recorded use of old helio as a colour name in English was in 1926.

== In culture ==
- The color has been widely referenced as a characterization, the colour of key plot objects, or as flavor text in many works:
  - Heliotrope was a popular colour reference of Ray Galton and Alan Simpson, script writers of Hancock's Half Hour.
  - In James Joyce's Finnegans Wake, "heliotrope" is the answer to the Maggies' riddle. Throughout the chapter, the word "heliotrope" is disguised a number of times, hidden either in anagrams, riddles, puns, or obscure allusions.
  - In Harry Potter and the Deathly Hallows, the Polyjuice Potion brewed in order to disguise Hermione Granger as Mafalda Hopkirk is described as having a "pleasant heliotrope colour."
- The periorbital purplish discoloration occurring in dermatomyositis is called the "Heliotrope rash" after the colour.
- Heliotrope was among the handful of "half-mourning" colours worn by Victorians during the last stage of mourning.
- "Heliotrope" is the title of the fourth track on At the Drive-In's 1999 EP Vaya.
- Heliotrope was referenced as a health status condition of the service droid Kryten in the Red Dwarf Series V episode Terrorform.
- "Heliotrope Bouquet" is a slow drag two step by Scott Joplin (with contributions from Louis Chauvin) composed in 1907.
- In the TV series Yellowjackets, the members of the new religious movement surrounding Lottie Matthews wear heliotrope robes; as she says, "We make the dye ourselves from the flowers used to treat wounds."

== See also ==
- Heliotrope (disambiguation)
- Lists of colors
