= Heliotrope =

Heliotrope most often refers to:

- Heliotropium, a genus of flowering plants
- Heliotrope (color), a pink-purple color – the color of the flowers of the aforementioned plants

Heliotrope may also refer to:

== Natural science ==
- Heliotrope (bloodstone), a variety of jasper or chalcedony
- Heliotropism, plants' diurnal motion in response to the sun's movement
- Heliotrope moth, a moth of the family Erebidae

== Art, media and entertainment ==
- Heliotrope, a story collection by Justina Robson
- Heliotropes (band), a Brooklyn-based band
- "Heliotrope" (song), by At the Drive-In
- "Heliotrope", a song by Robyn Hitchcock on the album Moss Elixir
- Heliotrope Studios, a video game developer
- Heliotrope (film), a lost 1920 American silent drama film
- Miss Heliotrope, the governess in Elizabeth Goudge's children's book, The Little White Horse
- "Heliotrope", a song by Runnner on the album Always Repeating

== Other uses ==
- Heliotrope, a distinctive rash associated with dermatomyositis, including juvenile dermatomyositis
- Heliotrope (instrument), in surveying, a long distance survey target based on mirror-reflected sunlight
- Heliotrope (building), a rotating home built by Rolf Disch
- HMS Heliotrope
