= Steinthal =

Steinthal is a surname. Notable people with the surname include:

- Fritz Leopold Steinthal (1889-1969), de:Fritz Leoold Steinthal, German rabbi
- Heymann Steinthal (May 16, 1823 – March 14, 1899), German philologist and philosopher
- Max Steinthal (December 24, 1850 in Berlin; December 8, 1940 in Berlin), German banker
