= Dirigent =

Dirigent may refer to:

- Dirigent, another word for musical conductor
- Dirigent protein, a class of proteins which dictate the stereochemistry of a compound synthesized by other enzymes
