= Fuming =

Fuming may refer to:

- Ammonia fuming, a technique for darkening oak and other woods
- Sun Fuming, a Chinese judoka who competed in the 1996 Summer Olympics
