= Take a Picture =

Take a Picture may refer to:

- Take a Picture (album), by Margo Guryan
- "Take a Picture" (Carly Rae Jepsen song)
- "Take a Picture" (Filter song)
- "Take a Picture" (Lemon Demon song)
- "Take a Picture" (NiziU song)
