= Amalthea =

Amalthea may refer to:

- Amalthea (mythology), the foster-mother of Zeus in Greek mythology
- Amalthea (moon), a moon of Jupiter
- 113 Amalthea, a main-belt asteroid
- The Cumaean Sibyl or Amalthea, a priestess presiding over the Apollonian oracle at Cumae, a Greek colony near Naples, Italy
- Lady Amalthea, a character in The Last Unicorn
- Amalthea Cellars, a winery in New Jersey, United States

== Ships ==
- Amalthea (1863), a barquentine bombed by Anton Nilson in 1908
- Amalthea (1881), a steam yacht built as Iolanthe, renamed Amalthæa, and later renamed Iolaire
- Amalthea (1985), a cargo ship
