= Consultation =

Consultation or consultative may refer to:

- Public consultation, a process by which the public's input on matters affecting them is sought
- Consultation (Texas), the 1835 Texas meeting of colonists on a proposed rebellion against the Republic of Mexico
- The service of a consultant, a professional who provides advice in an area of expertise
- Consultation (doctor), a formal meeting with a medical doctor for discussion or the seeking of advice
- Consultation in object-oriented programming, see Object aggregation
- An event similar to a symposium
- Consultative status, a standing granted by the United Nations to selected non-governmental organizations

== See also ==
- Consultant (disambiguation)
