= Wickham Vineyards =

Vineyard in Hampshire, England

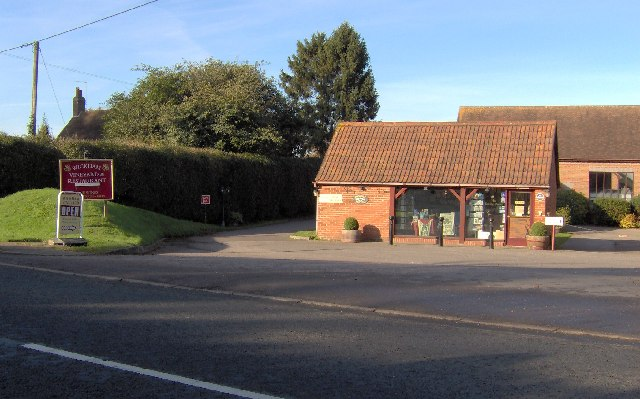
Vineyard entrance

Wickham Vineyards are a vineyard and wine maker in England, located in Wickham, Hampshire. Established in 1984, the vineyard occupies 18 acres (73,000 m^{2}) of a 40-acre (160,000 m^{2}) estate. One of the white wines, named "Fumé", that the vineyard produces is served as the United Kingdom House of Commons house wine.

== Estate ==
As well as the areas set aside for vines, the estate also comprises the winery, a single building where the grapes are crushed and fermented, tasting rooms, a shop, a restaurant and a nature reserve of unimproved woodland. Visitors are able to take audio assisted guided tours, walking amongst the vines and seeing the wine making process in action. Information is also provided on the history of English winemaking, from the Roman occupation to the present day, as well as the history of Wickham Vineyard itself. The restaurant is situated to provide visitors a view of the main vineyard. The estate also provides facilities for open air performances by local acting groups during the summer months.

== Wine ==
The Vineyard produces red, white and sparkling wines. Originally only white wine was produced, but warmer and longer growing seasons permitted the planting of new red grape vines. The wine is produced entirely on the estate. The grapes are normally harvested in October; after harvesting, they are crushed and then fermented on site. The full process takes place in a specially converted 200-year-old barn, that has been fully upgraded to modern standards. The grape varieties are typically Germanic, due to the similar climate. Grapes produced include Dornfelder, Bacchus and Reichensteiner. A number of the wines have won awards, both nationally and internationally. One bronze award granted to the vinery in 2007 was the first for an English vineyard in many years. The vineyard also undertakes contract wine making, using the on site facilities with grapes produced by other growers. Two of the wines are matured in traditional French oak barrels, and traditional French and German wine making techniques feature strongly in most of the wines produced by the vineyard.
