= Hauff =

Hauff is a surname. Notable people with the surname include:

- Angelika Hauff (1922–1983), Austrian actress
- Paul Hauff (born 1970), Australian rugby league footballer
- Reinhard Hauff (born 1939), German film director
- Wilhelm Hauff (1802–1827), German poet and novelist
- Helena Hauff, German DJ and Music Producer
