= Nordau =

Nordau is a surname. Notable people with the surname include:

- Max Nordau (1849–1923), Zionist leader, physician, author, and social critic
- Maxa Nordau (1897–1993), French painter, daughter of Max
