= Saint-Basile =

Saint-Basile may refer to the following places:

- Saint-Basile, Ardèche, a commune in the department of Ardèche, France
- Saint-Basile, Quebec, in Quebec, Canada
- Saint-Basile, New Brunswick, in New Brunswick, Canada
- Saint-Basile-le-Grand, Quebec, in Quebec, Canada

See also:

- Saint-Bazile, a commune in the department of Haute-Vienne, France
