= HMS Heliotrope =

At least two ships of the Royal Navy have been named HMS Heliotrope after the genus of flower.

- HMS Heliotrope (1915) was an Azalea-class sloop launched in 1915 and sold for scrapping in 1935.
- HMS Heliotrope (K03) was a Flower-class corvette launched in 1940 and transferred to the United States in 1942 as USS Surprise, returned to the Royal Navy in 1945 she was sold into mercantile service as Heliolock in 1946.
