= Kostiantyn Voblyi =

Ukrainian economic geographer

- Born: Kostiantyn Hryhorovych Voblyi; May 27, 1876
- Died: September 12, 1947 (aged 71)
- Education: Imperial University of Warsaw
Awards
Order of Lenin	Order of the Red Banner of Labour
- Scientific career
- Fields: Economics, statistics

Kostiantyn Hryhorovych Voblyi (Ukrainian: Костянтин Григорович Воблий; May 27, 1876, Tsarychanka (now Dnipropetrovsk region) – September 12, 1947, Kyiv) was a Ukrainian economic geographer, scientist economist, professor of the Kyiv University, academician of the Ukrainian Academy of Sciences (1919), Vice-president of the Ukrainian Academy of Sciences (1928-1930), director of the Institute of Economics (1943–1947). Honored Scientist of Ukraine (1944), awarded the Order of Lenin and the Order of the Red Banner of Labour.

== Biography ==
Voblyi Kostiantyn Hryhorovych "Basic Course in Political Economy"

Born in Tsarychanka in the family of a priest on May 27, 1876, he lost his father in the first year of life. His mother and her children began to live in the house of their father, Pyotr Bashchinsky. Voblyi spent his childhood under the influence of his grandfather, a priest. After completing the course at the public school, Voblyi entered the Poltava Theological Seminary. At the Poltava Theological Seminary, he showed interest in mathematics, history and later philosophy. Both in the theological school and in the seminary, he studied at the expense of the state. After graduating in 1896, he was sent to the Kyiv Theological Academy. Here he studied foreign languages, philosophy, psychology and history. The scholastic direction at the academy soon disappointed him and he decided to go to university. He postponed university admission until after graduating from the academy. He graduated from the academy with a PhD in theology. He began his literary career at the academy, with notes in the "Kyiv Word", as well as translations from English. In his fourth year at the academy, he published a large translation of a theological work in the Kharkov journal Vira and Razum.

In 1900 he entered the Faculty of Law of the University of Tartu, in 1901 he transferred to the University of Warsaw to the Faculty of Law. Here he found a literary work and began to study under the guidance of Professor Simonenko. He graduated from the University of Warsaw in 1904 with a gold medal. From 1906 he began teaching at the University of Kyiv as a private assistant professor of political economy and statistics. In 1907, he taught at the Kyiv Commercial Institute. Together with his colleague Mitrofan Dovnar Zapolsky, who headed the Commercial Institute, they established the Society of Economists in Kyiv and disseminated commercial knowledge. In addition to teaching, Voblyi paid much attention to the management of scientific activities of students, whose research was published in the journal "Izvestia Kyiv Commercial Institute", published from 1909 to 1919.

From 1906 to 1909 he was a private associate professor of political economy and statistics at the University of Kyiv, where he passed the oral examination for a master's degree in political economy, and later became a professor at the Kyiv Commercial Institute.

From the 1910–1911 academic year, Voblyi became dean of the economic department and headed it until 1917. During this period he prepared and published a number of textbooks: "Political Economy", "Fundamentals of Insurance Economics", "Statistics. Handbook for lectures ". At the end of 1917, Voblyi became the rector of the Kyiv Commercial Institute. It is thanks to him organizational activity within the walls of this educational institution October 13, 1918, was the First All-Ukrainian Congress of Economists and Statisticians. In 1918–1921 he was a professor at Tavriya University. Later he became the chairman of the Society of Economists at the All-Ukrainian Academy of Sciences.

The period of 1923–1927 was favorable both for the development of the economy and for the development of science. From 1923 to 1926, Voblyi held the position of head of the economic and statistical department of the Exchange Committee of the Kyiv Commodity Exchange. In order to scientifically and legally substantiate Ukraine's foreign trade with neighboring countries, he wrote a number of articles on trade relations, means of regulating trade, problems and features of the formation of the structure of agriculture, its place and importance in total foreign trade.

From 1927 to 1930, headed the Commission for the Study of the National Economy of Ukraine.

Since 1933, Voblyi headed the Department of Economic Geography at Kyiv University. In 1936 he created a department of economic geography within the structure of the Institute of Economics of the Academy of Sciences of the USSR.

In the period from 1934 to 1938, Voblyi worked as a member of the commission, which studied the economic resources of Ukraine.

With the beginning of World War II, Voblyi moved to Bashkortostan, where he resumed the Institute of Economics in a new place, in 1942 he became director of this institute and continued his research work. In 1944, the Institute of Economics and the team of scientists returned to Kyiv. In the same year, the scientist was awarded the title of Honored Scientist of the Ukrainian SSR. As director of the Institute of Economics Voblyi worked until 1947 and at the same time headed the Department of Economic Geography at the University of Kyiv.

He died on September 12, 1947, in Kyiv.

== Scientific works ==
Voblyi studied the economic resources of Ukraine, in particular study of labor and raw material potential of the Dnieper, which became a priority for the scientist. In his article "Productive Forces of Ukraine" Voblyi stressed that minerals are a valuable source of natural productive forces that give industrial direction to the Ukrainian national economy and that these natural resources are the key to the harmonious development of the two main productive forces of agriculture and industry.

Voblyi gave a thorough description of the Nikopol manganese deposit, emphasizing that manganese increases the hardness and viscosity of iron and steel alloys. The scientist also emphasized the significant economic potential of high-quality granite, kaolin, and limestone deposits, taking the Tokovsk deposit of light pink and red granite as an example.

Much of Voblyi's scientific work was devoted to the problems of development and deployment of productive forces of Ukraine, the creation of new industries and integrated development of areas. The scientist identified scientific approaches to economic zoning of Ukraine, identified the following areas in the country: South-East, Central and West.

Essays on the history of Polish factory industry

=== List of works ===
- Statistics: Handbook for lectures - Kyiv,1908
- Essays on the history of Polish factory industry - Kyiv, 1909
- Transatlantic migration, its causes and consequences. - Kyiv, 1904
- The third professional-industrial census in Germany, Volume 1. - Kyiv, 1911
- Economic geography of the USSR. - Kyiv, 1930.
- The problem of the Great Dnieper. - Minsk, 1933. (Belarusian)
- Essays on the history of the Russian-Ukrainian sugar beet industry. - Kyiv, 1931.
- Economic geography of the USSR. - Kyiv, 1930.
- Organization of work of a researcher. - Kyiv, 1943–1948 (3 editions).

"Essays on the history of Russian-Ukrainian sugar beet industry" was a significant contribution to the further study of the leading sector of the economy. In the three-volume edition the author thoroughly analyzed the features of economic development of Ukraine in the XIX - early XX centuries., Highlighted the characteristic trends in the sugar beet industry: the consequences of concentration of production, the role of bank capital.

== Awards ==
Voblyi was awarded the Order of Lenin and the Order of the Red Banner of Labour, the Medal "For Labor Valor". He is also an Honored Worker of Science and Technology of the USSR (1944).

== Sources ==
1. Павловский И. Ф. Краткий биографический словарь ученых и писателей Полтавской губернии / И. Ф. Павловский. – Полтава, 1912. – 238 с.
2. Полонська-Василенко Н. Д. Українська Академія Наук : (нарис історії) Ч. І: 1918–1930 / Н. Д. Полонська-Василенко. – Мюнхен, 1955. – 150 с.
3. Ровнер О. Г. Костянтин Григорович Воблий : бібліографія / О. Г. Ровнер. – Наук. думка, 1968. – 77 с.
4. Вернигора Л. Наукові погляди К. Г. Воблого – розвиток та новації/ Л. Вернигора // Вісн. Київ. нац. ун-ту ім. Т. Г. Шевченка. Економіка. – К., 2006. – Вип. 85. – С. 57–61.
5. Полонська-Василенко Н. Д. Українська Академія Наук (нарис історії) Ч. ІІ : 1918–1930 / Н.Д. Полонська-Василенко. – Мюнхен, 1958. – 214 с.
6. Лисоченко І. Д. Костянтин Григорович Воблий / І. Д. Лисоченко// Фонди відділу Рукописів Центральної наукової бібліотеки АН УРСР. – Наук. думка, 1982. – С. 24–32.
7. Іщук С. І. Дослідження особливостей формування АПК у працях академіка К. Г. Воблого / С. І. Іщук // Вісн. Київ. нац. ун-ту ім. Т. Г. Шевченка.Географія. – 1999. – Вип. 44. – С. 11–15.
8. Корецький Л. Н. Костянтин Григорович Воблий – фундатор української економіко-географічної школи / Л. Н. Корецький // Вісн. Київ. нац. ун-ту ім. Т. Г. Шевченка. Географія. – 1999. – Вип. 44. – С. 6–9.
9. Пістун Н. Д. Костянтин Григорович Воблий – видатний український економіст-географ / М. Д. Пістун. – ВИД, 2006. – 34 с.
10. Воблий К. Г. Нариси з історії російсько-української цукробурякової промисловості : в 2 т. / К. Г. Воблий. – ВУАН, 1930. – Т. 2. – 402 с.
11. Шевченко В. М. Життя та діяльність К. Г. Воблого (історіографія питання) / В.М. Шевченко // Гуманітарний журнал. – 2013. – No. 3. – С. 108–115.
