= Schleicher =

Schleicher may refer to:

- Schleicher (surname), a German surname
- Schleicher County, Texas, a county in Texas, United States
- Schleicher (Hammond), a neighborhood of Hammond, Indiana, United States

== See also ==
- Alexander Schleicher GmbH & Co, a sailplane manufacturer
- August Schleicher, German comparative linguist
- Kurt von Schleicher, penultimate chancellor of Germany during the Weimar Republic
