= Consultant (disambiguation) =

A consultant is a professional who provides advice in a particular area of expertise.

Consultant may also refer to:

== Entertainment ==
- The Consultant (film), a short film
- The Consultant (TV series), 2023 television series
- "The Consultant" (M*A*S*H), a 1975 TV episode
- "The Consultant" (Fringe), a 2012 TV episode
- "The Consultant" (My Hero), a 2003 TV episode
- The Consultants, a comedy sketch team
- The Consultant, a character of the music group Cardiacs

== Other uses ==
- Consultant (medicine), the title of a senior hospital-based physician or surgeon in some areas
- Consultation (Texas), the 1835 Texas meeting of colonists on a proposed rebellion against the Republic of Mexico
- Psychotherapy, mental health practice of counseling

== See also ==
- List of counseling topics
- Counselor (disambiguation), designation for practitioners in certain professions
- Consultation (disambiguation)
