= Criterion Theatre (disambiguation) =

Criterion Theatre is a West End theatre at Piccadilly Circus, London, England. Other theatres with the name include:

== Australia ==
- Criterion Theatre (Sydney), a demolished theatre in Sydney, Australia

== England ==
- Criterion Theatre (Coventry), a theatre in Earlsdon, Coventry, England

== United States ==
- Criterion Theatre (Bar Harbor, Maine), listed on the National Register of Historic Places
- Criterion Theatre (New York), former theatre in the Olympia Theatre, Broadway, Manhattan
- Kinema Theatre, also known as Criterion Theatre, former theatre in Los Angeles
