= Max Steinthal =

German banker and art collector

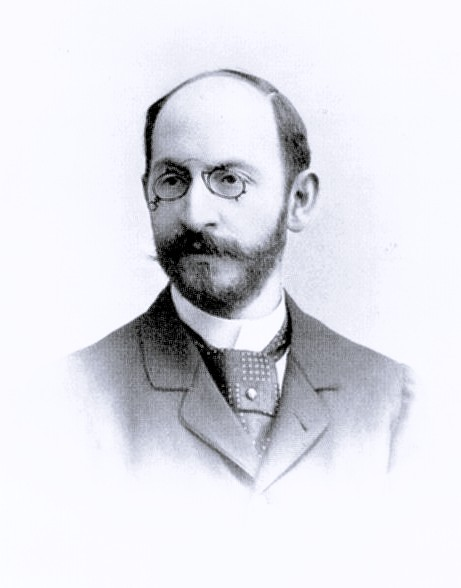
Max Steinthal 1893

Max Steinthal (born December 24, 1850, in Berlin; † December 8, 1940 in Berlin) was a German banker director and supervisory board chairman of the Deutsche Bank. He was responsible for financing Berlin's underground railway.

== Biography ==
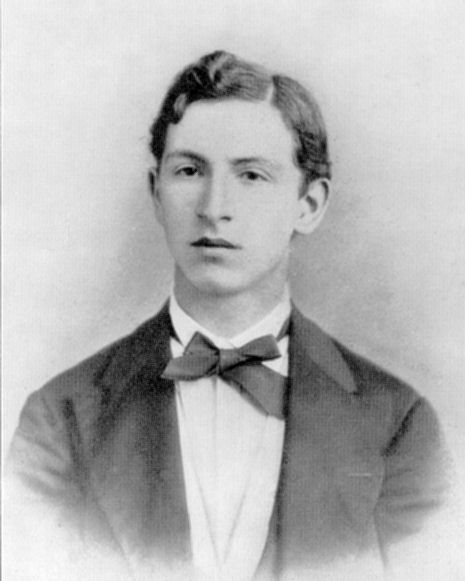
Steinthal at age 17

Max Steinthal was initially home schooled, and later attended the Königstädtische Realschule. On a trip to Sylt, Steinthal met Hermann Wallich (one of the two directors of Deutsche Bank). This meeting made a strong impression on Wallich and recommended Steinthal for a director position at Deutsche Bank. On December 15, 1873, Steinthal became part of the Deutsche Bank board of directors along with Wallich and Siemens.

Steinthal served on the Deutsche Bank's board of directors until the end of 1905. He then moved to the bank's supervisory board, which he chaired from 1923 to 1932. Steinthal was of Jewish descent, and in May 1935 he withdrew from the board of directors.

== Family ==
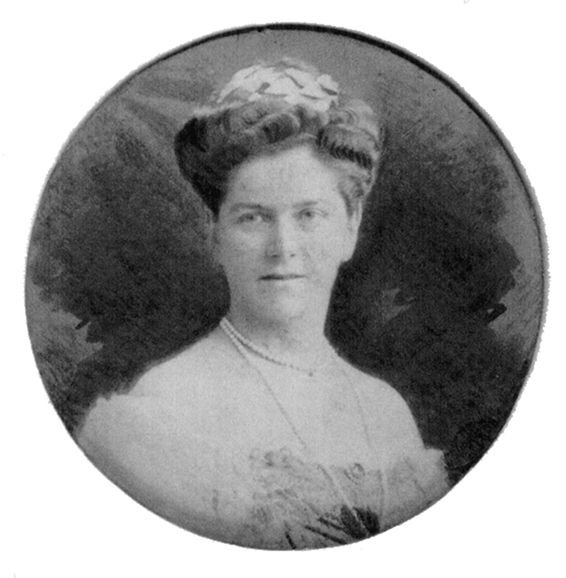
Fanny Steinthal around 1900

Max Steinthal was born in Berlin on December 24, 1850. His parents were wholesale merchant Eduard Steinthal and Johanna Steinthal; both had come to Berlin from Anhalt. Max Steinthal had an older brother Leopold and two younger sisters, Sophie and Elvira. They all grew up in their parents' house at Neue Friedrichstrasse 22.

Steinthal rented his first own apartment in 1876 at Vossstrasse 31 in Berlin-Mitte. In April 1889, he met Fanny Lindenthal from Vienna, and they married on July 4, 1889, in Vienna. On August 24, 1889, the couple moved at Roonstraße 9 in Berlin-Tiergarten.

In 1890 Fanny Steinthal gave birth to their first son, Erich. The couple had six more children; Daisy (1891), Eva (1892), Werner (1894), Eduard (1896), Ruth (1898) and Peter (1899).

In 1939, the couple were forced to sell their real estate holdings well below value and other assets were confiscated on account of being Jewish under Nazi Germany. Max Steinthal died a short time later on December 8, 1940, and was buried on December 19 in the family grave in the interdenominational forest cemetery in Heerstraße. On October 5, 1941, his wife Fanny passed away.

== Literature ==
- Max Fuchs: Max Steinthal on his eightieth birthday on December 24, 1930 (Festschrift). Berlin 1930.
- Paul Wittig : Max Steinthal - His work for the Berlin elevated and underground railways . In: Die Fahrt - magazine of the Berliner Verkehrs-Aktiengesellschaft, 3rd volume, no. 3, Berlin 1931, pp. 45–48.
- Erich Achterberg: Berlin high finance - emperors, princes, millionaires around 1900 . Fritz Knapp Verlag, Frankfurt am Main 1965. Biography Steinthal pp. 28–33.
- Max Steinthal: a banker and his pictures . Proprietas-Verlag, Berlin 2004, ISBN 3-00-014487-0.
- David Henry Marlow: Uncovering their names and stories. 300+ years of a German-Jewish family 1697-2024. New York: JewishGen Press, New York, 2025. ISBN 978-1-962054-18-8

== Art collection ==
Max Steinthal's art collection included paintings by Frans Snyders, Joaquín Sorolla and Giovanni Segantini, as well as works by Lovis Corinth, Édouard Manet, Camille Pissarro, Edvard Munch, Pablo Picasso, Max Liebermann, and others. The collection went missing during the Nazi Germany period. In 2003, 60 works from the collected were found in dresden, and exhibited in the Jewish Museum in Berlin.

== See also ==
- Deutsche Bank
