= Information criterion =

Information criterion may refer to:

- Information criterion (statistics), a method to select a model in statistics
- Information criteria (information technology), a component of an information technology framework which describes the intent of the objectives
