= Kriterion =

- Discipline: Philosophy
- Language: English, German
- Edited by: Christian J. Feldbacher-Escamilla, Alexander Gebharter

Publication details
- History: 1991–present
- Frequency: Triannual

Standard abbreviations
- ISO 4: Kriterion

Indexing
- ISSN: 1019-8288

Links
- Journal homepage; Online access

Kriterion: Journal of Philosophy is a peer-reviewed academic journal of philosophy that was established in 1991. The journal is dedicated to analytic philosophy and publishes articles in English and German. It is a sponsor of the annual Salzburg Conference for Young Analytic Philosophy (SOPhiA) since its inception in 2010.

The journal is listed as a key journal in The Philosopher's Index and included in the European Reference Index for the Humanities. It is abstracted and indexed in EBSCO databases and Scopus.
