= Luxury =

Luxury may refer to:

== Music ==
- Luxury (Georgia band), a rock band from Toccoa, Georgia
- Luxury (Iowa band), a power pop rock music band from Des Moines, Iowa
- Luxury (Fantastic Plastic Machine album), 1998
- Luxury (The Nein album), 2007
- "Luxury", a song by Azealia Banks off the album Broke with Expensive Taste
- "Luxury", a song by The Rolling Stones off the album It's Only Rock 'n Roll

== Other uses ==
- Luxury goods, an economic good or service for which demand increases more than proportionally as income rises
- Luxury tax, a tax on products not considered essential, such as speedboats or diamonds
  - Luxury tax (sports), a surcharge put on the aggregate payroll of a sports team to the extent to which it exceeds a predetermined guideline level set by the league
- Luxury car, an expensive automobile
- Luxury train, an expensive tourist train
- Luxury yacht, an expensive privately owned, professionally crewed yacht
- Luxury apartment, a type of property that is intended to provide its occupant with higher-than-average levels of comfort, quality and convenience
- Luxury hotel, a high-quality amenities, full-service accommodations and the highest level of personalized services
- Luxury resort, an exclusive vacation facility
- Luxury box, term for a special seating section in arenas, stadiums and other sports venues
- Luxury magazine, magazines devoted to fine craft and luxury goods
