= Anatoly Babko =

Soviet chemist (1905–1968)

- Анатолій Бабко
- Born: October 15, 1905; Anzhero-Sudzhensk, Tomsk Governorate, Russian Empire
- Died: January 7, 1968 (aged 61); Kiev, Ukrainian SSR, Soviet Union
- Education: Kiev Polytechnic Institute
- Awards: Honored Science and Technology Figure of Ukraine Order of Lenin Order of the Badge of Honour
- Scientific career
- Workplaces: Taras Shevchenko University (now Kiev University)

Anatoly Kyrylovych Babko (Ukrainian: Анатолій Кирилович Бабко; 15 October 1905 in Sudzhenskoye, Tomsk Governorate – 7 January 1968) was a Soviet chemist, specializing in analytical chemistry and in the chemistry of complex compounds.

== Biography ==
Babko was a student of Professor N. Tananaev, a Member of the Academy of Sciences of the Ukrainian Soviet Republic (since 1957), and an Honoured Science Worker of the Ukrainian SSR (after 1966). In 1939, he organized the research department at the Institute of General and Inorganic Chemistry of the Ukrainian SSR and managed it until the end of his life. In 1943 he was appointed to a professorship, and in 1944 became the Head of the Department of Analytical Chemistry at the University of Kiev.

Babko's main works are devoted to the physical chemistry of complex compounds and their use in analytical chemistry as well as photometric and fluorescence methods of analysis.

He published more than 450 scientific works and 9 books that have been translated into several languages.
