= Alexander Eichenwald =

Russian experimental physicist (1864-1944)

- Александр Александрович Эйхенвальд
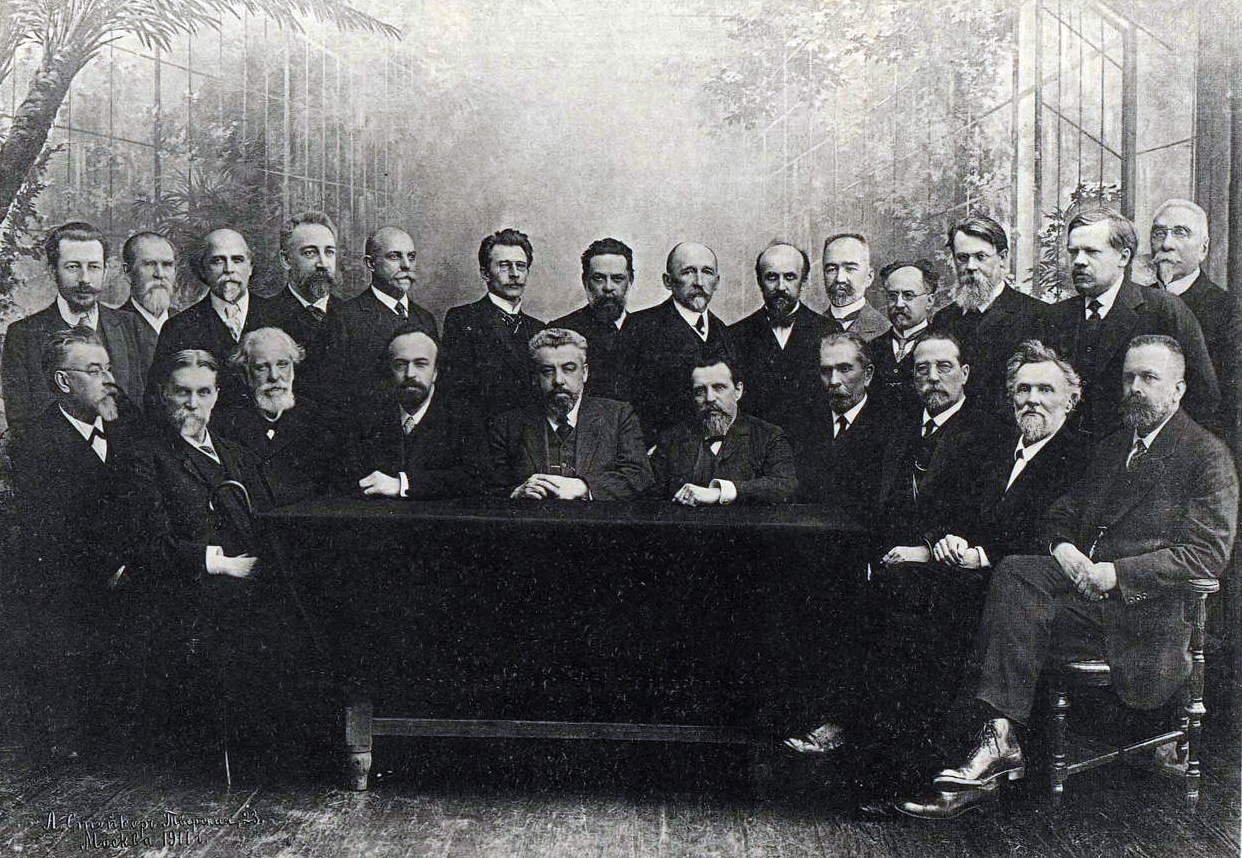
- In 1911, Eichenwald standing fifth from left with other professors at Moscow University
- Born: Alexander Alexandrovich Eichenwald; 4 January 1864; St. Petersburg, Russian Empire
- Died: 12 September 1944 (aged 80); Milan, Italy
- Education: University of Strasbourg
- Known for: Röntgen-Eichenwald experiment
- Scientific career
- Fields: Physics
- Workplaces: Moscow Engineering College; Railway Engineers Institute; Moscow University

Alexander Alexandrovich Eichenwald (Russian: Александр Александрович Эйхенвальд 4 January 1864 – 12 September 1944) was a Russian experimental physicist who worked on electrodynamics. He conducted experiments on electromagnetism, electrical fields, and on the construction of instruments to measure magnetic fields. His most famous experiment, following those of Wilhelm Röntgen, examined the predictions of James Clerk Maxwell. Named after them as the Röntgen-Eichenwald experiment, this demonstrated that the movement of static charges was no different from electric currents in that they produced an electromagnetic field.

Eichenwald was born in St. Petersburg where his father was an artistic portrait photographer while his mother was a musician. An interest in music among the children made him interested in acoustics. While at high school he became a friend of P. N. Lebedev and graduated from Moscow University in physics and mathematics. He then joined the St Petersburg Railway Institute and studied engineering after which he went to the University of Strasbourg where he focused on experimental physics under K.F. Braun and on theoretical physics under Emil Cohn. His doctorate in 1897 was on the absorption of electrical waves by electrolytes. He worked at the Moscow Engineering College from 1897 where his work included a demonstration of the magnetic field created by moving electrical charges. He constructed a simple magnetometer in 1903. He became director of the Railway Engineers Institute from 1905 and also taught at the Moscow University from 1906. After the death of Lebedev he presided over the Moscow Physics Society and from 1917 he was involved in organizing higher education in physics. Diagnosed with cancer he moved to Milan and wrote a textbook on electricity that went through multiple editions. In 1903 he demonstrated that static charges on a disc that was rotated could generate a magnetic field.
