= Fyokla =

Fyokla or Fekla (Russian: Фёкла) is an archaic Russian feminine given name derived from Greek Thekla (Ancient Greek: Θέκλα, Thékla, lit. 'God’s fame'). Notable people with the name include:

- Fyokla Bezzubova (1880-1966), Soviet and Russian narrator of folklore
- Fyokla Tolstaya (born 1971), journalist, cultural figure, and TV and radio presenter

== Fictional characters ==
- Fyokla Ivanovna from Nikolai Gogol's comedy Marriage and derivative works

== See also ==
- Tecla
- Thecla (disambiguation)
- Tekla (given name)
- Takla (name)
