= Elwen =

Early saint(s) venerated in Cornwall or Brittany

Elwen (also known as Elvan, Elven, etc.) was the name of an early saint or saints venerated in Cornwall and Brittany. The hagiographical material asserts that he came to Cornwall from Ireland in the company of Breage and six others, but this is attested late. A chapel at Porthleven in Sithney parish, Cornwall, dedicated to Elwen, existed from the 13th century until 1549, and in Brittany several sites and placenames are associated with possibly related figures.

== History ==
The name St Elvan is attached to a chapel at Porthleven in Sithney recorded as early as 1270. This chapel was rebuilt c. 1510 but was destroyed in 1549. Elwen appears in John Leland's extracts from a lost late-medieval Life of Saint Breage included in his Itinerary. Leland's extracts name Elwen as one of Saint Breage's seven Irish companions who join her on her mission to Cornwall, the others being Sithney, Germoe, Mavuanus (perhaps Mawnan), Crowan, Helena, and Tecla. The text also refers to a Life of St Elwinus, evidently a lost hagiography of Elwin. A few medieval and early modern Cornish sources mention Elwen and his chapel, but little else is known of him there. One document mentions him in connection to an otherwise unknown Saint Gelvin, though this may be based on a mistake or a fraud. In Brittany two apparently distinct saints with corresponding names are known. A Saint Elouan is said to have had his chapel at Saint-Guen, and to have been buried there, while a Saint Elven gave his name to the commune of Elven, Morbihan. It is unknown which, if either, may be identified with the Cornish Elwen. In modern times a Church of St Elwyn has been established at Hayle, probably inspired by the legend recorded in Leland's work that Elwen and company had landed there from Ireland.
