= St Breage's Church =

St Breaca’s Church, Breage
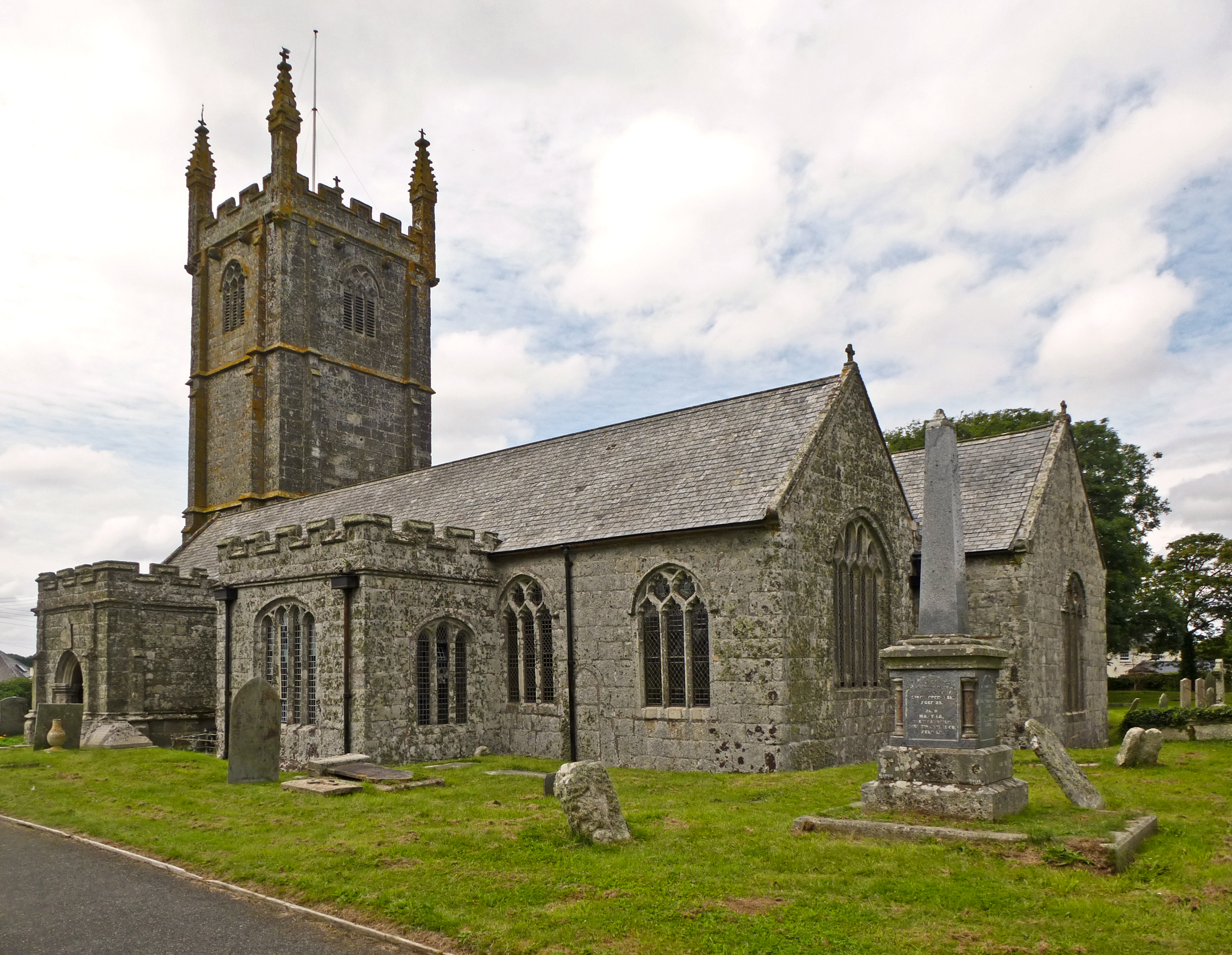
- St Breage’s Church, Breage
- St Breaca’s Church, Breage
- 50°06′29.46″N 5°19′55.42″W
- Location: Breage
- Country: Great Britain
- Denomination: Church of England

History
- Dedication: St Breaca

Administration
- Province: Province of Canterbury
- Diocese: Diocese of Truro
- Archdeaconry: Cornwall
- Deanery: Kerrier
- Parish: Breage with Godolphin and Ashton
- Location within Cornwall

Listed Building – Grade I
- Official name: Church of St Breaca
- Designated: 10 July 1957
- Reference no.: 1158264

Breage Parish Church is the Anglican parish church of the parish of Breage, Cornwall, England, United Kingdom. It is dedicated to Saint Breage or Breaca, said to have been an Irish nun who came to Cornwall in the 5th century.

== Description ==
The church was built of granite in the 15th century; it has two aisles separated from the nave by granite arcades of standard design. On the north wall are five medieval wall paintings: four saints are portrayed, Ambrose, Christopher, Corentine and Hilary (there are fragmentary ones also), and the Warning to the Sabbath-Breakers, one of the finest examples in the country of a Sunday Christ. Another fine example is to be found a few miles away in St Just. A Roman milestone of the 3rd century is preserved in the church and in the churchyard there is an unusual Hiberno-Saxon cross head. The inscription on the milestone is: IMP [C] DO NO MARC CASSI: this incomplete text refers to the Emperor (Marcus Cassianus) Postumus, 258-68 AD (Collingwood, RIB no. 2232). The church reopened on feast day, 26 December 1879, following the restoration of the chancel which was enlarged and choir stalls provided. The roof was repaired, walls plastered and the floor pointed. The church contains the vault of the Godolphin family.

== History ==
After the Norman Conquest the church of Breage was of interest to three lords: the bishop of Exeter, who held the manor of Methleigh; the earl of Cornwall, who held the manor of Winnianton; and the earl of Gloucester, who held the manor of Binnerton. In the 12th century the earl of Gloucester (Lord of the manor of Binnerton) gave the church to the abbey of Tewkesbury but in this he exceeded his legal power and after eighty-six years the earl of Cornwall intervened and bestowed it on the abbey of Hailes. The parish of Breage had, until the 19th century, the unusual feature of dependent parochial chapels at Germoe, Cury and Gunwalloe, the last two being added to it in 1246 by the Earl.

== Organ ==
The organ was built by Henry Willis and Sons for Thomas Robins Bolitho. It then moved to Truro Cathedral and was rebuilt in Breage in 1968 by Hele & Co of Plymouth. A specification of the organ can be found on the National Pipe Organ Register.

== Gallery ==
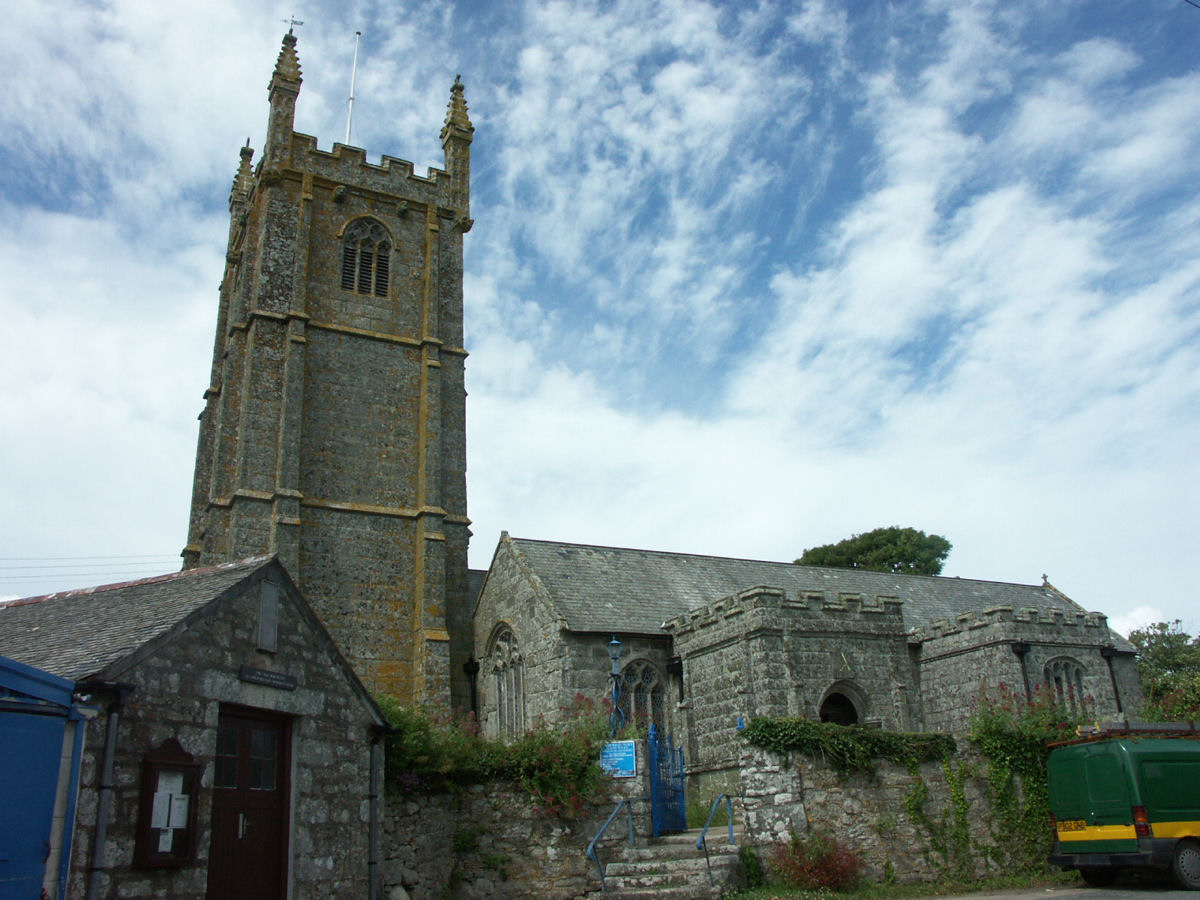
St. Breaca's church

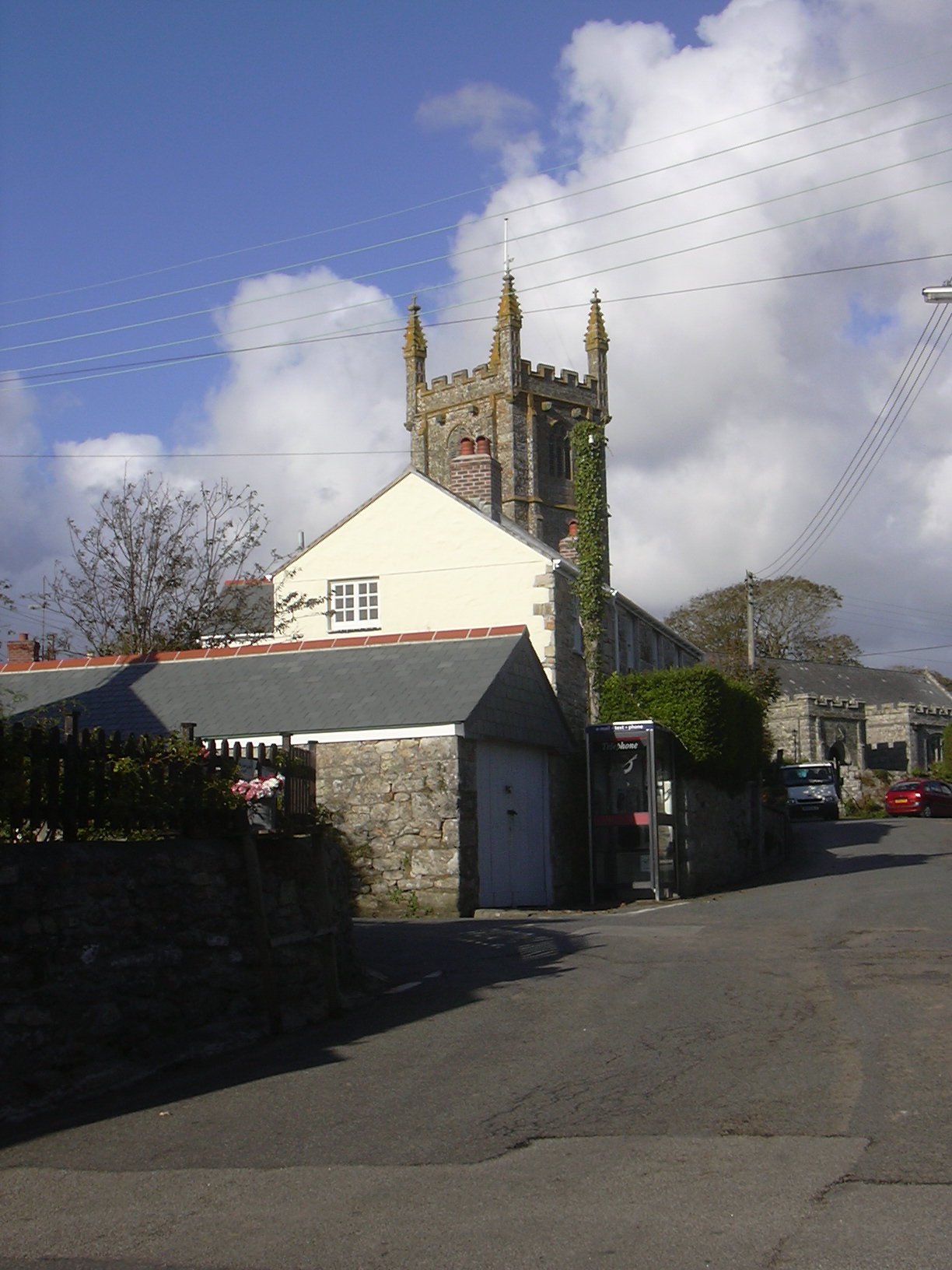
View of the church

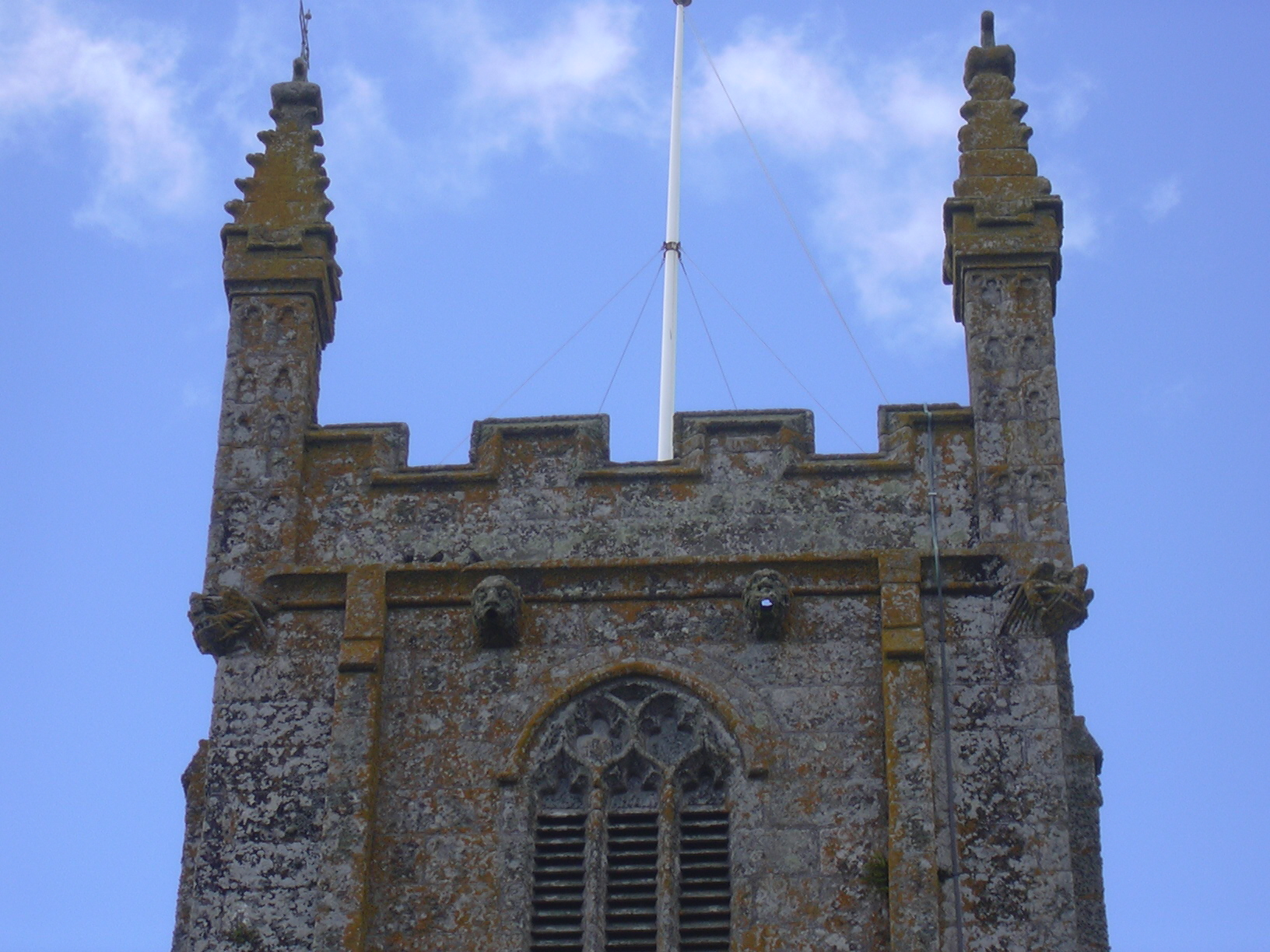
Church tower

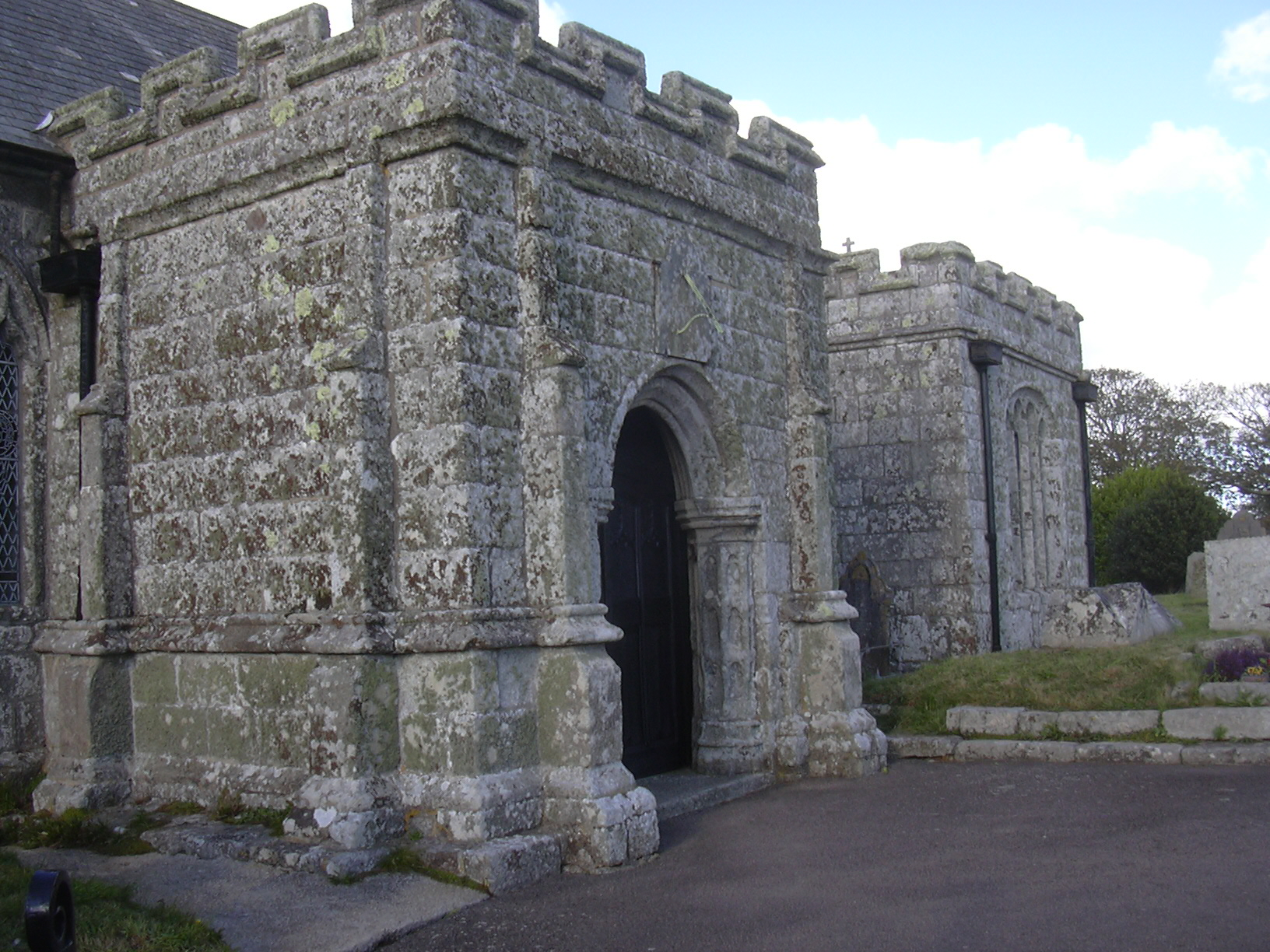
Church porch

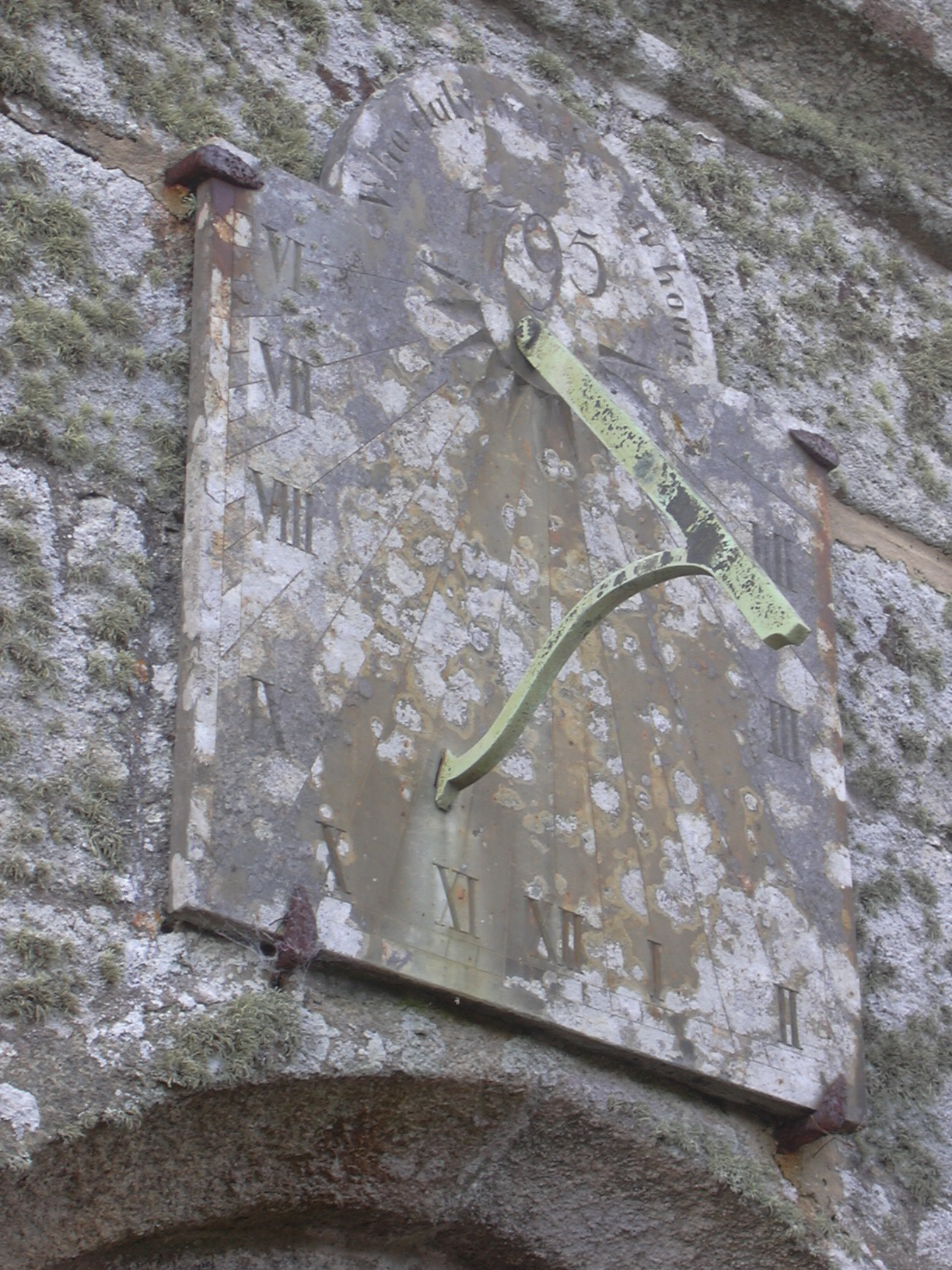
Sundial over doorway of the porch

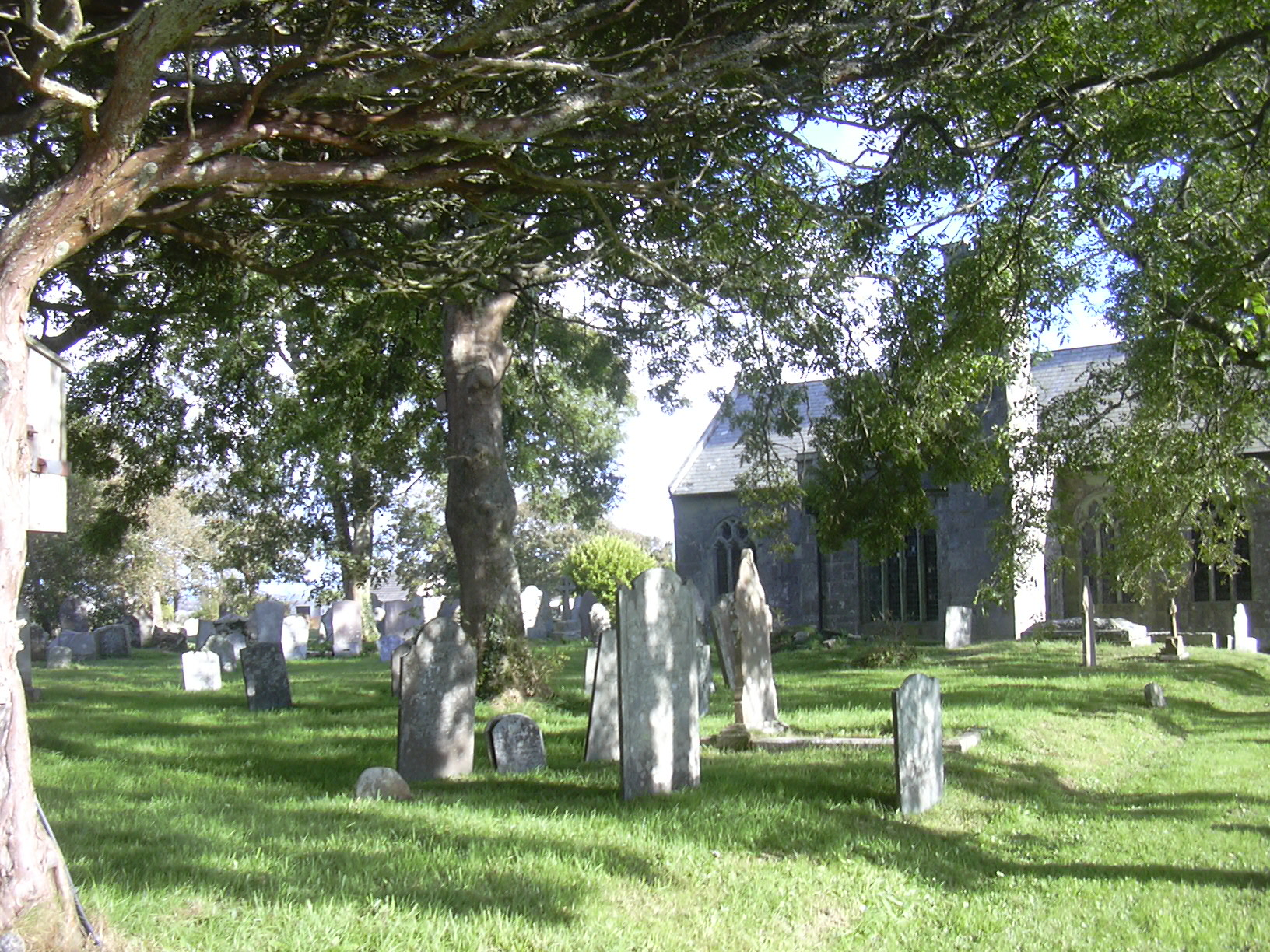
Churchyard

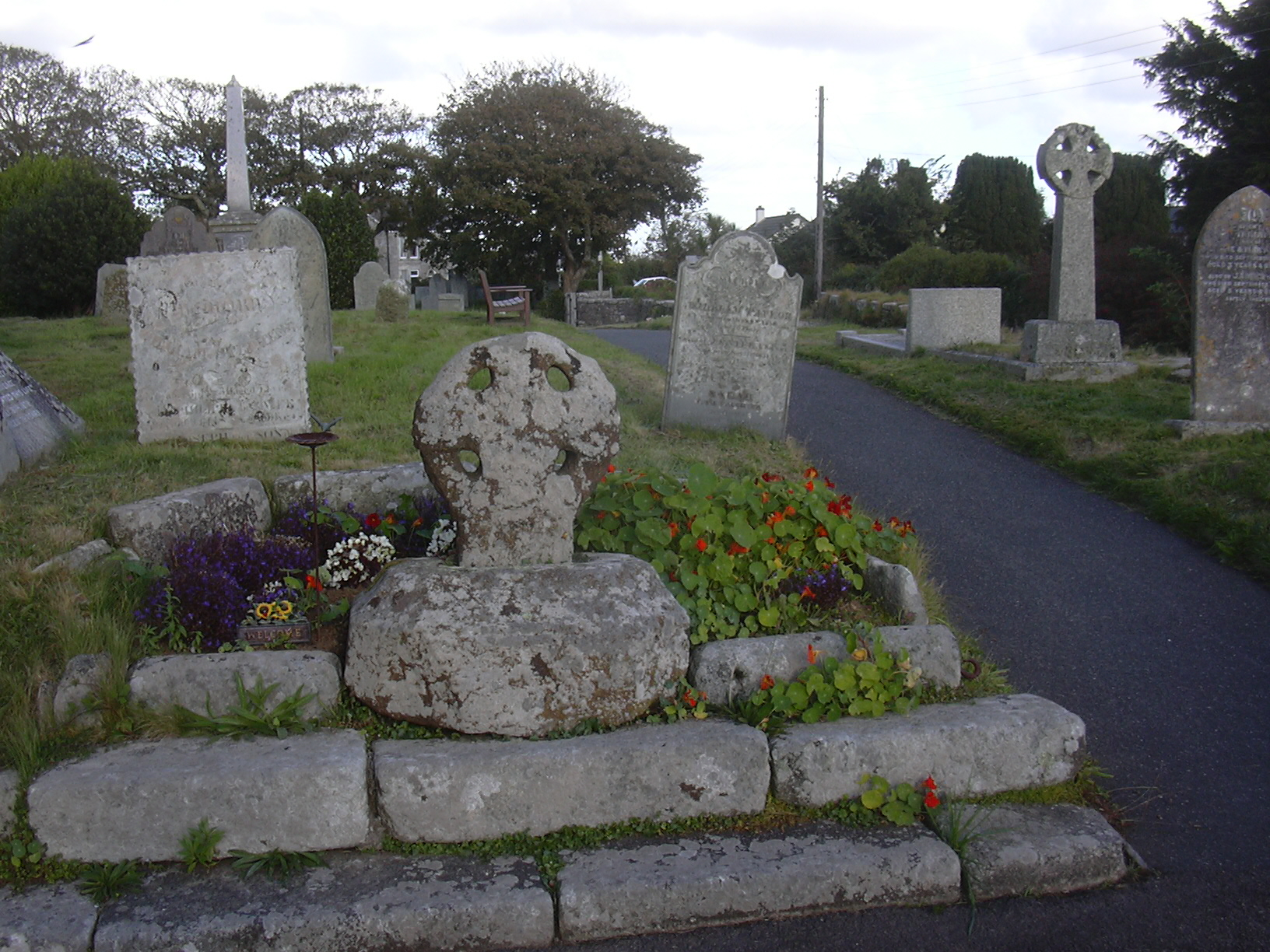
Ancient cross in churchyard

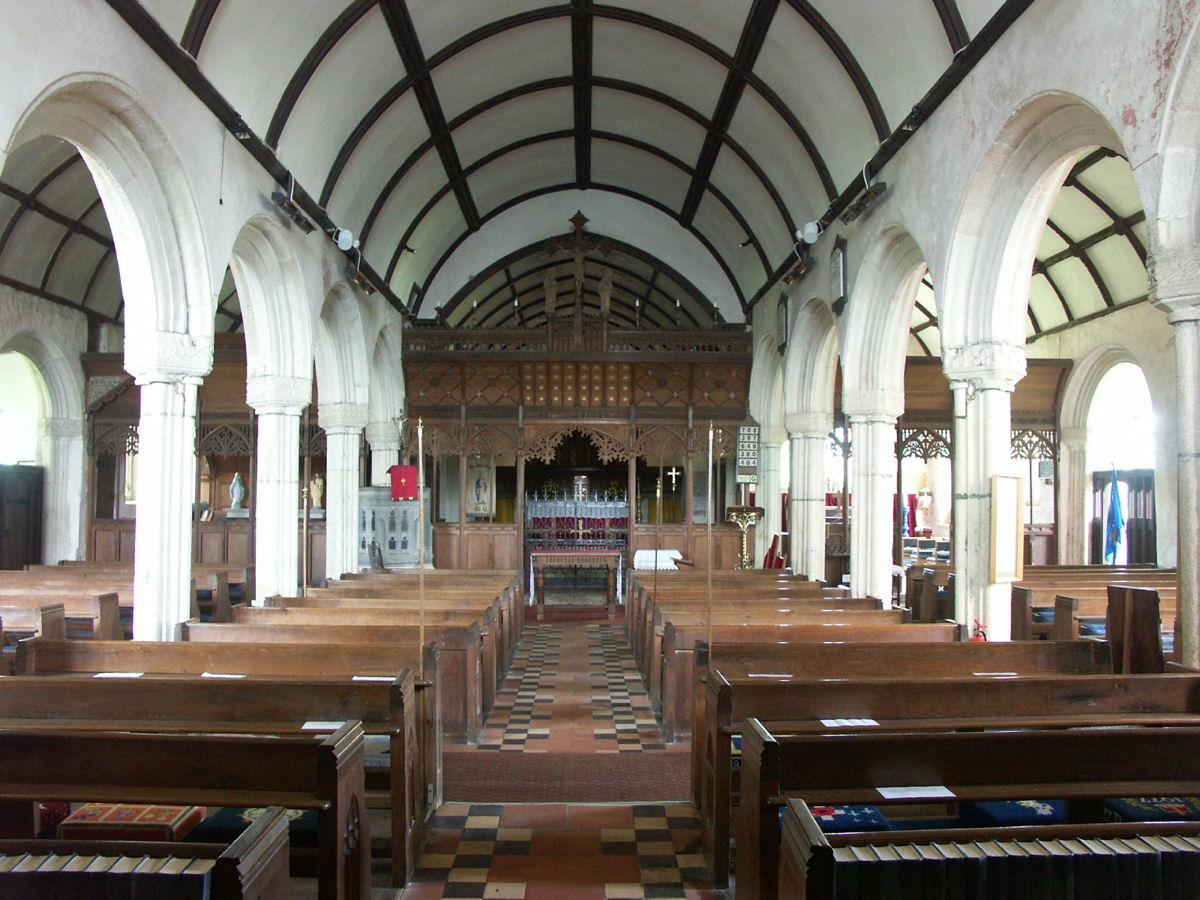
Nave

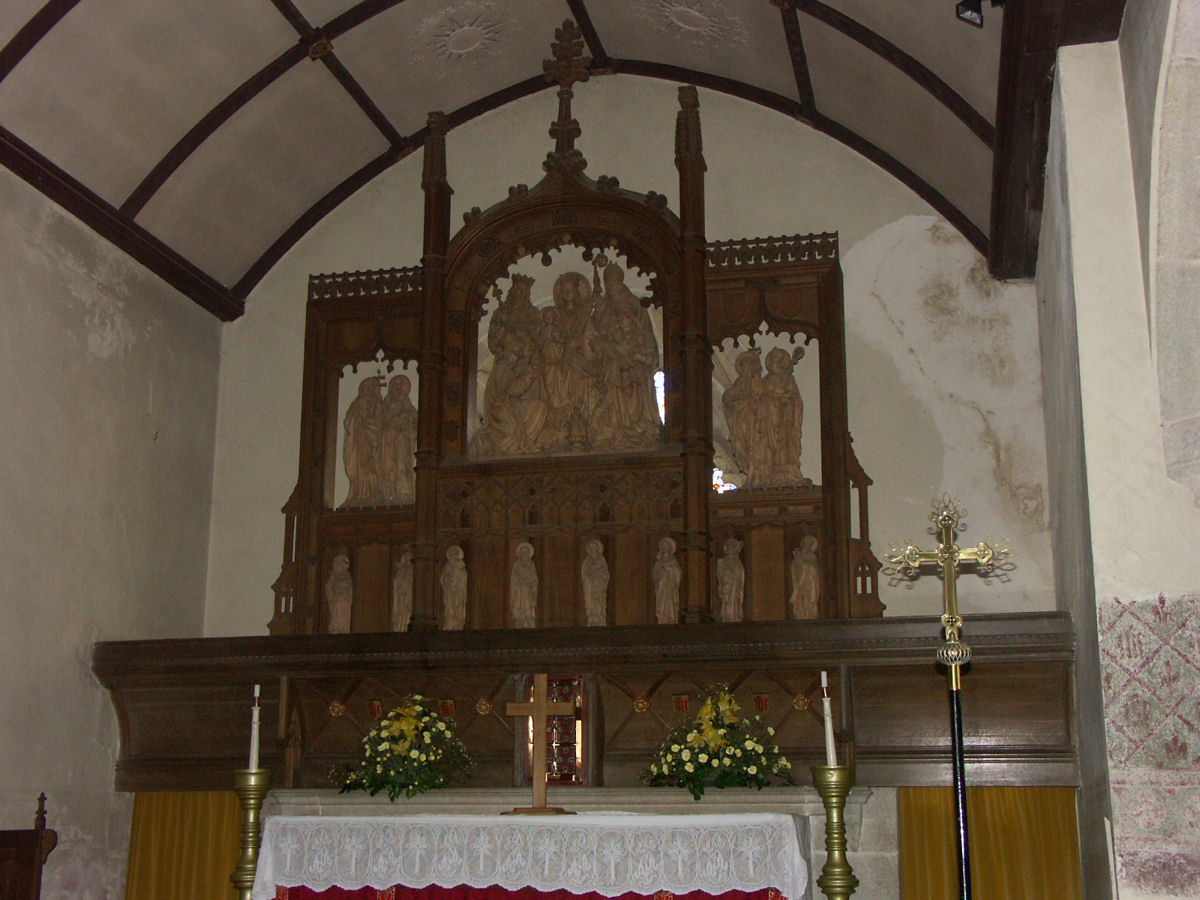
Altar

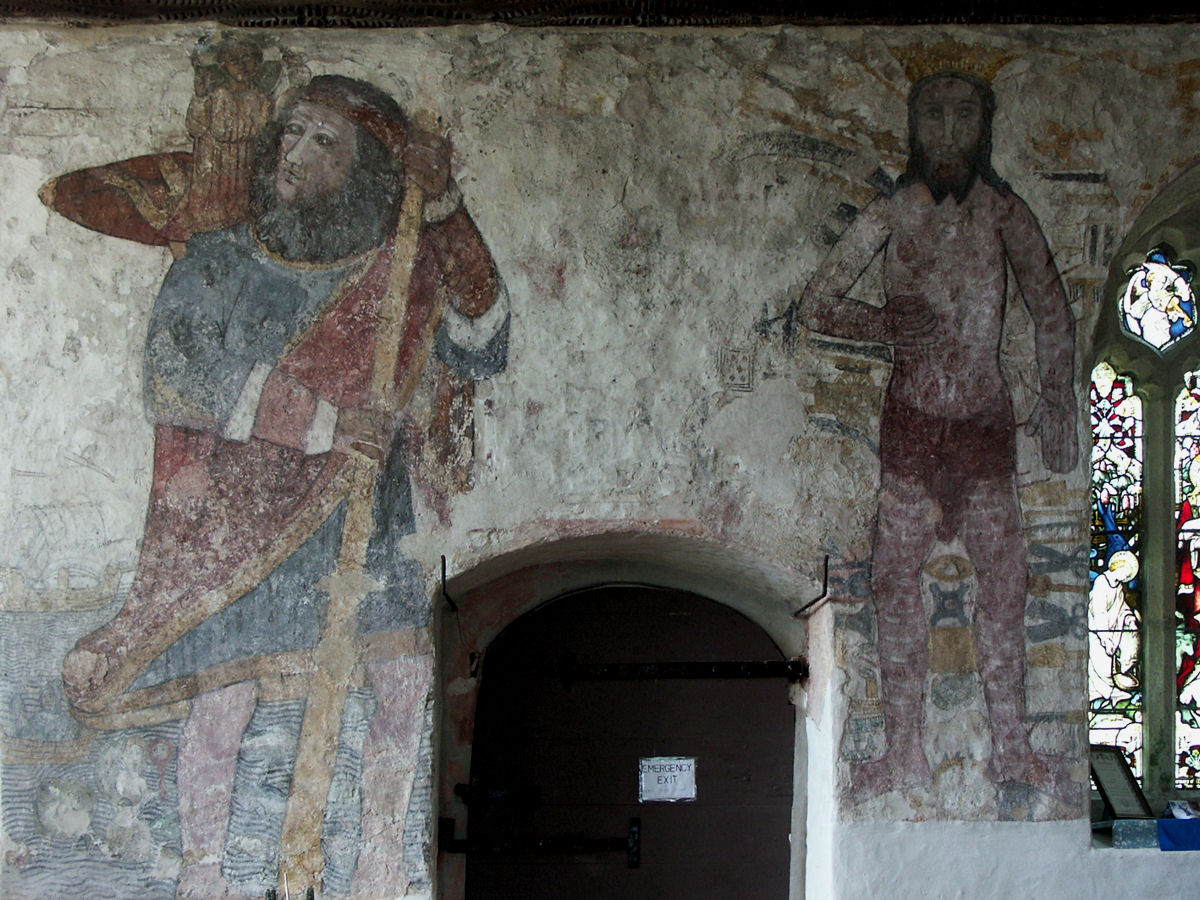
Frescos

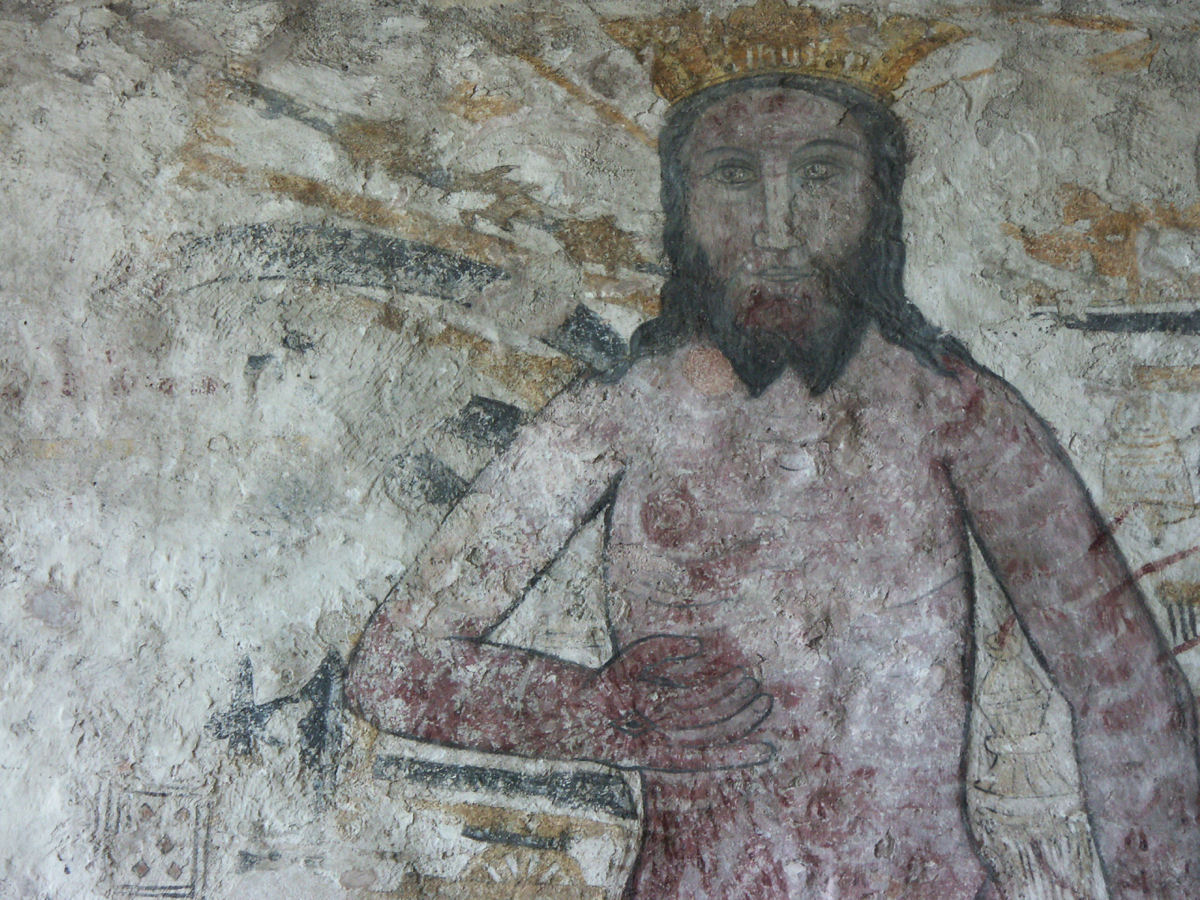
Frescos

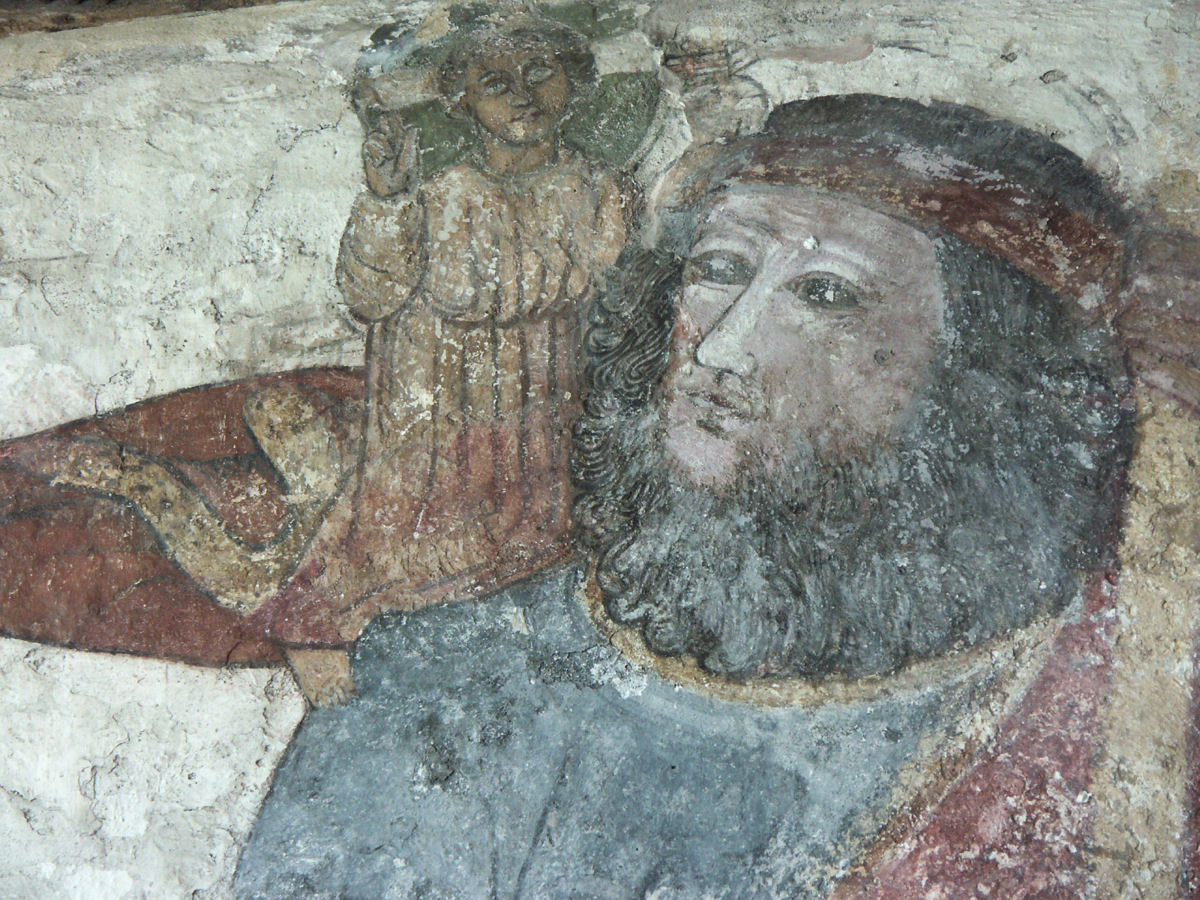
Fresco of St. Christopher
