= St Teath =

Village in Cornwall, England

Coordinates: 50.593°N 4.736°W

St Teath: Cornish: Eglostedha
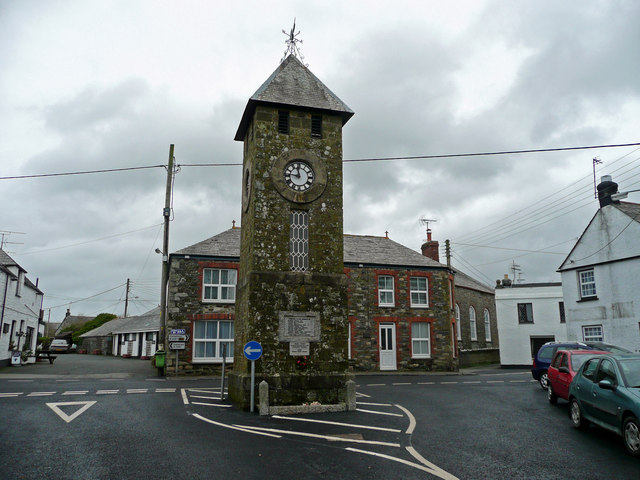

- Location within Cornwall
- Population: 2,628 (Civil Parish, 2011)
- Civil parish: St Teath
- Unitary authority: Cornwall
- Ceremonial county: Cornwall
- Region: South West
- Country: England
- Sovereign state: United Kingdom
- Post town: BODMIN
- Postcode district: PL30
- Dialling code: 01208
- Police: Devon and Cornwall
- Fire: Cornwall
- Ambulance: South Western
- UK Parliament: North Cornwall

St Teath (/tɛθ/; Cornish: Eglostedha) is a civil parish and village in north Cornwall, England, in the United Kingdom.

== Geography ==
The village is situated approximately three miles (4.8 km) southwest of Camelford and seven miles (11 km) northeast of Wadebridge. The hamlet of Whitewell lies to the west. The parish population at the 2011 census was 2628. An electoral ward also exists which includes Delabole and St Breward; the population for this ward at the same census was 3,957.

== History ==
=== Parish church ===
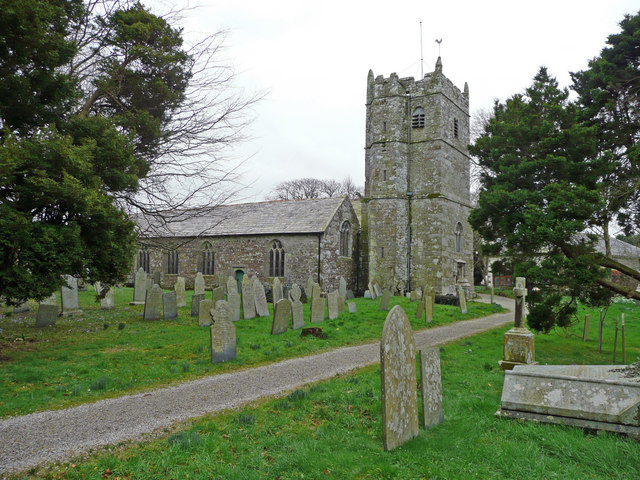
St Tetha's church, exterior

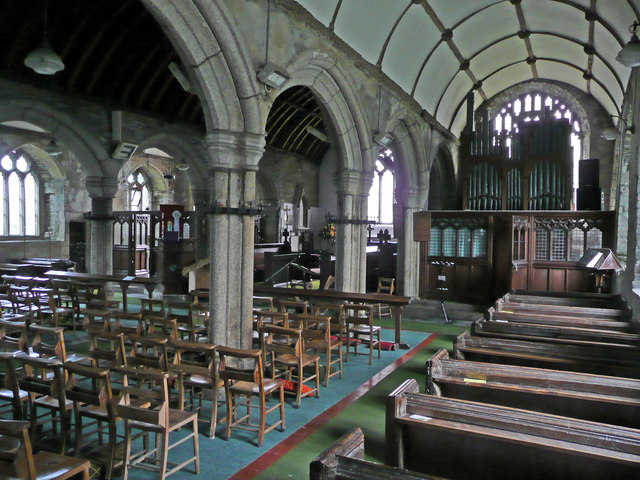
St Tetha's church, interior

The parish church is dedicated to Saint Tetha the Virgin, a 5th-century companion of Saint Breaca and supposed daughter of King Brychan Brycheiniog in Wales. The church is a Grade I protected building consisting of a Norman core and 15th-century expansions. It is large, with a nave and two aisles. The church was collegiate until 1545 when the two prebends were abolished. The church was renovated in 1879, reopening 6 November by the Bishop of Truro, Edward Benson.

There is a Cornish cross in the cemetery on the other side of the road from the churchyard. An account of it was given in the Antiquarian Magazine, August 1883. Part of it was once used as a footbridge; it was afterwards used in the churchyard wall but the parts were reunited and repaired; both the head and the shaft are ornamented. There is also a cross base in the churchyard.

=== Anne Jeffries ===
St Teath was the birthplace in December 1626 of Anne Jeffries, a woman said to have associated with fairies.

=== Cattle sale and cricket match ===
The first recorded mention of cricket in Cornwall is an advertisement in the Sherborne Mercury on 18 June 1781 for the sale of cattle at St Teath, near Camelford. The advertisement was dated 14 June 1781 and signed by Nathaniel Long.

Whereas the annual sale for cattle at St Teath, near Camelford, Cornwall held at the first Tuesday in July had for several years being rather neglected. This is to inform the publick, that the Gentlemen farmers etc of the neighbourhood will produce a large show of cattle of the said day being the 3rd day of July next.
NB. The evening of the same day will be cricketed for a very handsome silver-laced hat. 20th Century

During World War II, bombs were dropped twice on or near St Teath, this occurring on consecutive days in August 1940. On the second occasion, 30 August, none of the bombs that were dropped actually exploded.

== Cornish wrestling ==
Throughout the 19th century, St Teath hosted Cornish wrestling tournaments in various venues including the New White Hart Inn.

== Notable people ==
- Moses Pitt (c. 1639–1697) a bookseller and printer known for the production of his Atlas of the world.
- Abraham Bastard (1789–1868), wrestler, beat the famous wrestler James Polkinghorne (1788–1851), at a famous match at St Kew in the 1820s. He later became a preacher, who wrote a well known book of his life.
- Philip Gross (born 1952), from Delabole is a poet, novelist, playwright, children's writer
