= Germochus =

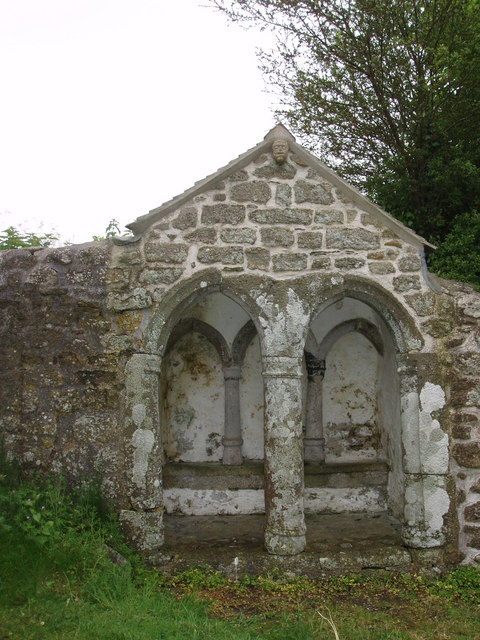
St Germoe's chair

Saint Germochus or Germoe was an early 6th century saint active in Cornwall and Brittany.

He is the patron saint of the parish of Germoe in Cornwall. He is said to have been a king and one of the companions of St Breage (they were Irish missionaries who landed at Hayle). His shrine in Germoe church was a place of pilgrimage until the Reformation. In the churchyard is St Germoe's Chair, no doubt connected to the cult of the saint but in what way is unclear. According to legend Germoc was a king in Ireland whose feast day is 6 May.
