= Thekla =

Thekla (Ancient Greek: Θέκλα, Thékla, lit. 'God’s fame') is a Greek feminine given name made famous by Saint Thecla, a 1st-century Christian martyr. In English, it is more commonly romanized as Thecla.

In modern Russian language it is known as Fekla/Fyokla and considered to be an archaic name.

Thekla may also refer to:

== People ==
- Thekla, wife of Michael II (died c. 823), first Empress-consort of Michael II of the Byzantine Empire
- Thekla, daughter of Theophilos (c. 822/823 – after 867), daughter of Emperor Theophilos of the Byzantine Empire, Augusta
- Thekla (wrestler) (Thekla Kaischauri, born 1993), Austrian professional wrestler
- Mother Thekla (1918–2011), nun, academic and collaborator of the English musician and composer John Tavener
- Thekla Beere (1902–1991), Irish civil servant
- Thekla M. Bernays (1856–1931), American author, journalist, artist, art collector, speaker, and suffragette
- Thekla Brun-Lie (born 1992), Norwegian biathlete
- Thekla Friedländer (born 1849, death unknown), German soprano and social reformer
- Thekla Knös (1817–1880), Swedish poet
- Thekla Krause (born 1969), German footballer
- Thekla Resvoll (1871–1948), Norwegian botanist and educator
- Thekla Reuten (born 1975), Dutch actress
- Thekla Schild (1890–1991), German architect
- Thekla Carola Wied (born 1944), German actress

== Other ==
- The Thekla (Old Profanity Showboat), originally a cargo ship, now a music venue in Bristol, England
- Thekla, suburb in Leipzig, site of a subcamp of Buchenwald
- Thekla lark, species of lark
- Thekla, Inc., a game development company created by Jonathan Blow
- "Thekla: Eine Geisterstimme" poem by Schiller, set to music by (among others) Schubert
- one of the 55 cities described in the novel Invisible Cities by Italo Calvino

== See also ==
- Thecla (disambiguation)
- Thelma (disambiguation)
- Tekla (given name)
- Tecla
- Tekla, software company
- Takla (disambiguation)
