= Mo Lua =

Mo Lua may refer to:

- Mo Lua of Killaloe, saint and founder of Killaloe, County Clare, Ireland
- Mo Lua of Kilmoluagh, saint among the Soghain of County Galway, Ireland
- Mo Lua mac Carthach, an Irish cleric associated with Clonfert or Cloonfad
- Saint Moluag, also known as Mo Lua
