= Thecla (disambiguation) =

Thecla, Tecla, or its variants (Ancient Greek: Θέκλα, Thékla, lit. "God's fame") is a Greek feminine given name made famous by Saint Thecla (Thecla of Iconium), a 1st-century Christian martyr.

It may also refer to:

== People ==
- Thecla of Alexandria, virgin, martyr, saint, and companion of Faustus, Abibus and Dionysius of Alexandria.
- Thecla of Aquileia, one of a group of virgins from Aquileia, Italy, martyred in the 1st century according to the "Acts of St. Hermagoras".
- Thecla of Gaza, Christian martyr with Agapius (died 306).
- Thecla of Kitzingen, a saint.
- Thecla of Persia (4th century), martyr.
- Saint Tetha (c. 5th century), virgin and saint, a Welsh nun credited with the establishment of St. Teath in Cornwall.
- Thecla Valloires, a 6th-century hermit.
- Princess Thecla of Georgia (1776–1846), member of the Georgian royal family.
- Thecla Åhlander (1855–1925), Swedish stage and film actress.
- Thecla Boesen (1910–1996), Danish film actress.
- Thecla Merlo (born Teresa Merlo), theologian who assisted in the founding and development of the Daughters of St. Paul in the 20th century.
- Julia Thecla, a 20th century American artist.

== Places ==
- Municipality of Sainte-Thècle, Quebec, Canada

=== Churches ===
- Cathedral of St. Thecla, the original Milan Cathedral
- St. Tecla's Chapel at Tarragona Cathedral in Spain
- Church of St. Thecla Welden, at Welden in Germany
- Church of St. Thecla, Quebec, Canada

== Other uses ==
- Thecla (butterfly), a butterfly genus

== See also ==
- Thekla (disambiguation)
- Tecla
- Theca, in botany and developmental biology, a case, covering, or sheath
- Tekla, software company
- Takla (disambiguation)
