= Ship Inn, Porthleven =

Grade II listed pub in Porthleven, England

Ship Inn
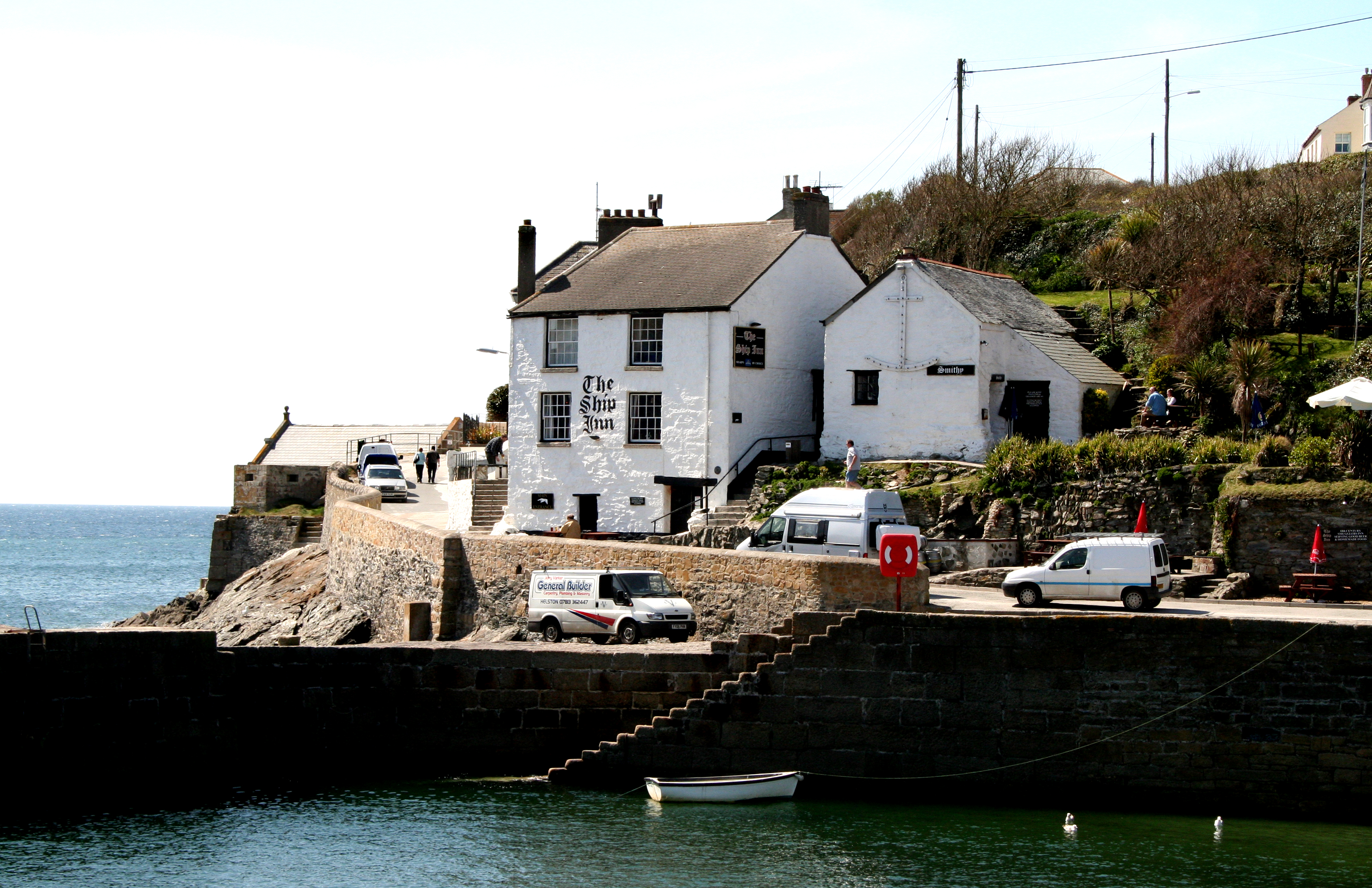
- The building in 2010, looking southwest

General information
- Type: Public house
- Location: Mount Pleasant Road, Porthleven, Cornwall, England
- Coordinates: 50°05′00″N 5°19′02″W
- Completed: c. 1805
- Designations

Listed Building – Grade II
- Official name: The Ship Inn
- Designated: 22 May 1972
- Reference no.: 1355055

Website
- Official website

The Ship Inn is a Grade II listed public house in Porthleven, Cornwall, England. Dating to around 1805, it stands on Mount Pleasant Road, overlooking Porthleven harbour from its western side. It is constructed of painted rubble with granite dressings. It is two storeys with a basement. Some sources claim the building dates to the 17th century.

As of 2020, the pub's landlord is Mo Spicer, who took over the business in 2017.
