= Porthleven Lifeboat Station =

Former RNLI lifeboat station in Cornwall, England

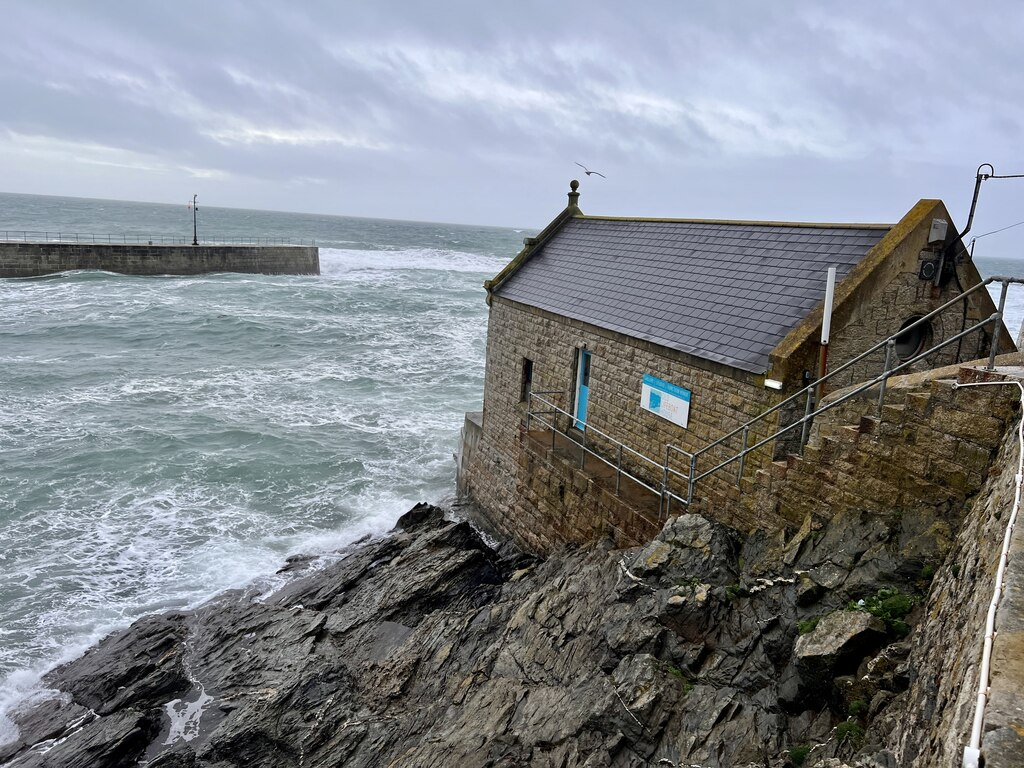
- 1894 Lifeboat Station, Porthleven

- Porthleven, Cornwall

General information
- Status: Closed
- Type: RNLI Lifeboat Station
- Location: Old Lifeboat House, Mount Pleasant Road, Porthleven , Cornwall, TR13 9JS, England
- Coordinates: 50°04′58.0″N 5°19′05.2″W
- Opened: 26 February 1863
- Closed: 1929

Porthleven Lifeboat Station was located at the fishing port of Porthleven, the most southerly port in Great Britain, which sits approximately 20 miles (32 km) south west of Truro, overlooking Mount's Bay in Cornwall.

A lifeboat was first placed at Porthleven in 1863, by the Royal National Lifeboat Institution (RNLI).

After 66 years of operation, Porthleven lifeboat station was closed in 1929.

== History ==
With the offer of £150 from Thomas James Agar-Robartes, 1st Baron Robartes, MP for Cornwall East towards the cost of a lifeboat, and with the agreement of Inspecting Commander C. J. Austen, RN, H.M. Coastguard at Penzance, to act as Honorary Secretary, at a meeting of the RNLI committee of management on Thursday 31 July 1862, it was decided that a lifeboat station be established at Porthleven, in Mount's Bay, Cornwall.

A 30-foot self-righting 'Pulling and Sailing' (P&S) Lifeboat, one with both sail and (6) oars, and costing £200, along with a carriage which cost a further £60, was dispatched on 26 February 1863, transported from London to Truro free of charge by the Great Western, Bristol and Exeter, South Devon and Cornwall railway companies, arriving on 4 March 1863. The lifeboat was named Agar Robartes.

A boathouse was constructed at a cost of £145, on land leased from Mr Edward Coode, of St. Austell. Unusually, the lifeboat house was some distance from the water, and located on Beacon Road, above the Ship Inn.

A new lifeboat would be placed at Porthleven in 1882. The cost of the larger 34-foot self-righting boat and transporting carriage, was defrayed by the legacy of Mrs Eliza Wright of Southport, and was named in memory of her late son, Charles Henry Wright.

Between 08:00 and 09:00, in calm conditions on 5 October 1886, 25 fishing boats set out from Portleven. By 10:30, the sea was raging, and a red flag was hoisted, indicating "haste to harbour." Most boats returned safely, but entering the harbour was proving extremely difficult. The Charles Henry Wright was launched, and with coastguards on shore ready to assist given the high risk of being wrecked, eight of the boats were towed into harbour one at a time.

In 1894, a new boathouse with slipway was constructed at a cost of £1,395. It was located on the shore off Mount Pleasant Road, on the west side of the village and opposite the pier, but crucially, it was outside the harbour. The new boathouse was in an extremely exposed position. The high tide broke the doors open in 1896, and the roof was damaged in 1906, but in all but exceptional weather, the lifeboat could now be launched at anytime, without consideration to low-tide, and without the extraordinary effort it took to bring the boat down from Beacon Road.

On 18 March 1907, Porthleven lifeboat John Francis White (ON 444) would be one of four lifeboats sent to the aid of the SS Suevic, which ran aground on Stag Rock near Lizard Point. 18 people were brought ashore.

A later service on 3 August 1907 would see the men from the Seierskrandsen of Svendborg brought ashore by the lifeboat, having abandoned the vessel in the ship's boat, when the vessel ran ashore at Loe Bar. The vessel was later recovered by the lifeboat crew with assistance from local fishermen and a tug from Falmouth.

Apart from a couple of times required for assistance, no further rescues were made by the Porthleven lifeboat. Motor-powered lifeboats were placed at The Lizard in 1918, and Penlee in 1922, and the days for Porthleven's effectively obsolete 'Pulling and Sailing' lifeboat were numbered. Porthleven would actually receive a fourth and final lifeboat, Dash (ON 501), in 1926, but at that time, this boat was already 24-years-old, and just 2-years newer than the boat she replaced. At a meeting of the RNLI committee of management on 18 July 1929, the decision was made to close Porthleven Lifeboat Station.

The 1894 lifeboat house still stands, although the slipway was dismantled, and it is currently used as an Art Studio. The lifeboat on station at the time of closure, Dash (ON 501), was sold from service in 1929. The boat was later acquired in 1994, for restoration in Porthleven, but after years of neglect, it was destroyed in the car park of a Porthleven supermarket in 2004.

== Station honours ==
The following are awards made at Porthleven.

- RNLI Silver Medal

Peter Pascoe – 1865

- RNLI Bronze Medal

Thomas Hendy Matthews, Harbour Pilot – 1943

== Porthleven lifeboats ==
=== Pulling and Sailing (P&S) lifeboats ===
ON (Note: ON is the RNLI's Official Number of the boat.)	Name	Built	On Station	Class	Comments
Pre-407	Agar Robartes	1863	1863−1882	30-foot Peake Self-righting (P&S)	(Note: 30-foot x 7-foot (6-oared) Peake self-righting (P&S) lifeboat, gift of Mr T. J. Agar-Robartes MP of Bodmin, built by Forrestt of Limehouse, London, costing £196.)
183	Charles Henry Wright	1882	1882−1900	34-foot Self-righting (P&S)	(Note: 34-foot x 7-foot 9in (10-oared) self-righting (P&S) lifeboat, legacy of Mrs E. Wright of Southport, built by Woolfe of Shadwell, London, costing £363.)
444	John Francis White	1900	1900−1926	35-foot Self-righting (P&S)	(Note: 35-foot x 8-foot 6in (10-oared) self-righting (P&S) lifeboat, legacy of Mrs M. A. White of London, built by Thames Ironworks of Blackwall, London, costing £795.)
501	Dash	1902	1926−1929	35-foot Self-righting (P&S)	(Note: 35-foot x 8-foot 6in (10-oared) self-righting (P&S) lifeboat, legacy of Miss M. A. Parke of London, built by Thames Ironworks of Blackwall, London, costing £822.); Previously at Blyth and Brighton.

Pre ON numbers are unofficial numbers used by the Lifeboat Enthusiast Society to reference early lifeboats not included on the official RNLI list.

== See also ==
- List of RNLI stations
- List of former RNLI stations
- Independent lifeboats in Britain and Ireland
