= Boscreege =

Village in Cornwall, England

Coordinates: 50.12°N 05.37°W

Boscreege: Cornish: Boskrug
- Location within Cornwall
- OS grid reference: SW5930
- Shire county: Cornwall
- Region: South West
- Country: England
- Sovereign state: United Kingdom
- Post town: Penzance
- Postcode district: TR20
- Police: Devon and Cornwall
- Fire: Cornwall
- Ambulance: South Western

Boscreege (Cornish: Boskrug) is a small village in the civil parish of Germoe in west Cornwall, in England, United Kingdom.

The village is on the southern edge of a former mining area, part of a geological formation known as the Tregonning-Godolphin Granite (one of five granite batholiths in Cornwall) which was formerly an important source of tin and copper ore (see also Geology of Cornwall).

The name Boscreege is an anglicisation of the Cornish language Boskrug, which contains the words bos 'dwelling' and krug 'barrow, mound'.
