= Tresowes Green =

Hamlet in Cornwall, England

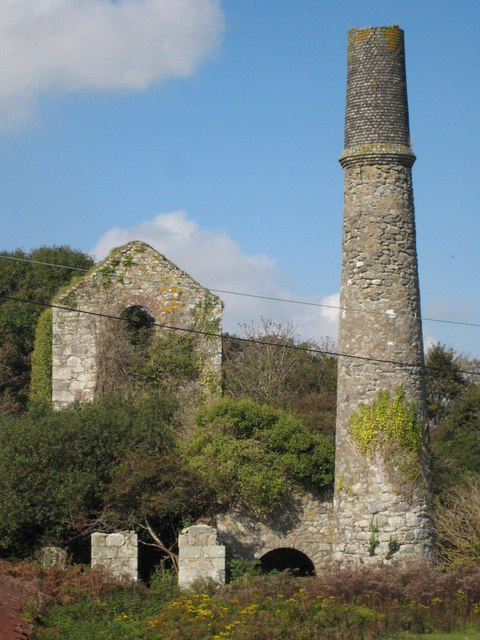
Engine house at Tresowes Green

Tresowes Green is a hamlet in the parish of Germoe, south west Cornwall, England, United Kingdom. It is situated next to the A394 road and is under Germoe Parish.
