= Tecla =

Tecla is a female given name. Notable people with the name include:

- Tecla Insolia (born 2004), Italian actress and singer
- Tecla Marinescu (born 1960), Romanian sprint canoer
- Tecla Namachanja Wanjala (born 1962), Kenyan peace activist
- Tecla Pettenuzzo (born 1999), Italian footballer
- Tecla San Andres Ziga (1906–1992), Filipina senator
- Tecla Scarano (1894–1978), Italian actress and singer
- Tecla Tofano (1927–1995), Venezuelan artist
- Tecla Tum, Kenyan politician
- Tecla Vigna (died 1927), Italian-American opera singer and teacher

== See also ==
- Tecla house
- Tekla (given name)
- Thecla (disambiguation)
- Thekla (disambiguation)
