= Tetha =

Welsh and Cornish saint

Saint Tetha
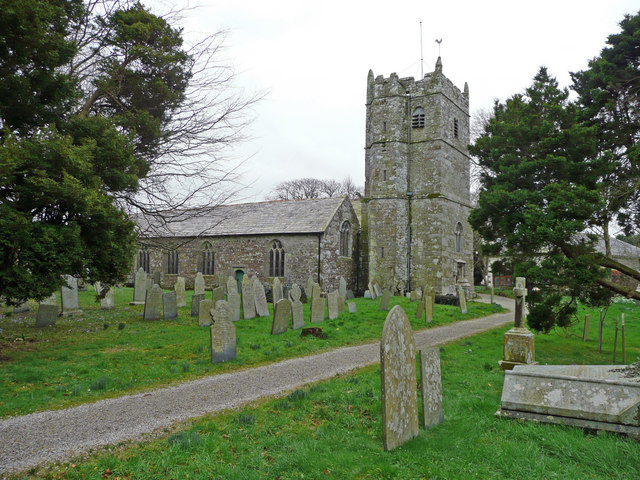
- St Tetha's in St Teath

Princess of Brycheiniog Virgin
- Born: 5th century
- Canonized: Pre-Congregation
- Major shrine: St Teath
- Feast: Various (lapsed)
- Patronage: St Teath

Tetha (Cornish: Tedha; Welsh: Tedda), also known as Teath (/tɛθ/), Tecla, and by a variety of other names, was a 5th-century virgin and saint in Wales and Cornwall. She is associated with the parish church of St Teath in Cornwall. Baring-Gould gives her feast day as 27 October, but this has been called a mistaken conflation with Saint Ia. In 1878, it was held on the movable feast of Whit Tuesday. Other sources place it on 1 May, 6 September, and (mistakenly) 15 January. It is no longer observed by either the Anglican or Catholic church in Wales.

== Name and identity ==
Early Latin records give the companion of Breaca and patron of St Teath the name Tecla, a form of the name Thecla borne by the first female martyr in Christianity. The Acts of Paul and Thecla was a common apocryphal work in the early church and the name was formerly relatively common. The editor of the Bollandists' mention of the saint (Note: Acta Sanctorum, Vol. LX, Octobris, Vol. XII, "De SS. Ia et Breaca Virginibus Eorumque Comitibus Uni, Sinino, Elwino, Maruano, Germocho, Crewenna, Helena, Thecla seu Etha, Gwithian et Gwinnear seu Wymero, in Cornubia Britannica", pp. 293 ff. Imprimerie Polleunis, Ceuterick, & Lefébure (Brussels), 1886. (in Latin) Cited in Bartrum.) and Bartrum consider the name mistaken or fictitious, but do not account for the early appearance of the name in records at St Teath itself. Accounts of Breaca's journey give her the additional name Etha, which some have considered a corruption of "Itha". This in turn has led to the saint becoming confused and conflated with the Irish saint Íde of Killeedy.

Meanwhile, other accounts credit St Teath to a daughter of Brychan of Brycheiniog named Tedda, Tethe, &c.

== Life ==
In Cornish sources, Tetha was listed among the daughters of Brychan, king of Brycheiniog in Wales, making her the sister of numerous other saints in Wales and Cornwall. She is listed among Saint Breaca's companions, who missionized Cornwall from Ireland around AD 460, by Leland and William of Worcester. Unlike some of her companions, she does not seem to have been martyred by Tewdwr Mawr, the hostile king of Penwith. (Note, however, that Borlase was of the opinion that the saint's name had been inserted in the list of Breaca's companions by mistake.)

== Legacy ==
A church of 'St Tecla' is attested in St Teath as early as 1201. The present Church of St Tetha largely consists of 15th-century improvements to a Norman original. It is listed as a Grade I protected building.

== See also ==
- Saint Tegla, a Welsh saint with whom she is sometimes conflated
- Thecla, the first female Christian martyr
