= Tekla (given name) =

- Gender: Female
- Name day: Latvia: 31 January, Sweden: 23 September

Origin
- Origin: From Ancient Greek: Θέκλα, Thékla
- Region of origin: Denmark, Finland, Hungary, Georgia, Latvia, Poland, Sweden

Other names
- Related names: Thecla, Tecla, Thekla

Tekla is a Latvian, Polish, Georgian, Ukrainian, Hungarian, and Scandinavian feminine given name.

== Notable people named Tekla ==
- Tekla Bądarzewska-Baranowska (1829/1834 to 1861), Polish composer
- Tekla Chemabwai (born 1950), Kenyan sprinter and middle-distance runner
- Tekla Griebel-Wandall (1866–1940), Danish composer and music educator
- Tekla Juniewicz (1906–2022), Polish supercentenarian, the oldest verified Polish person in history
- Tekla Nordström (1856–1937), Swedish xylographer
- Tekla Róża Radziwiłł (1703–1747), Polish–Lithuanian noblewoman

== See also ==
- Thekla
- Tecla
