= Porthleven =

Coordinates: 50°05′02″N 5°18′54″W

Porthleven: Cornish: Porthelvan
- Port
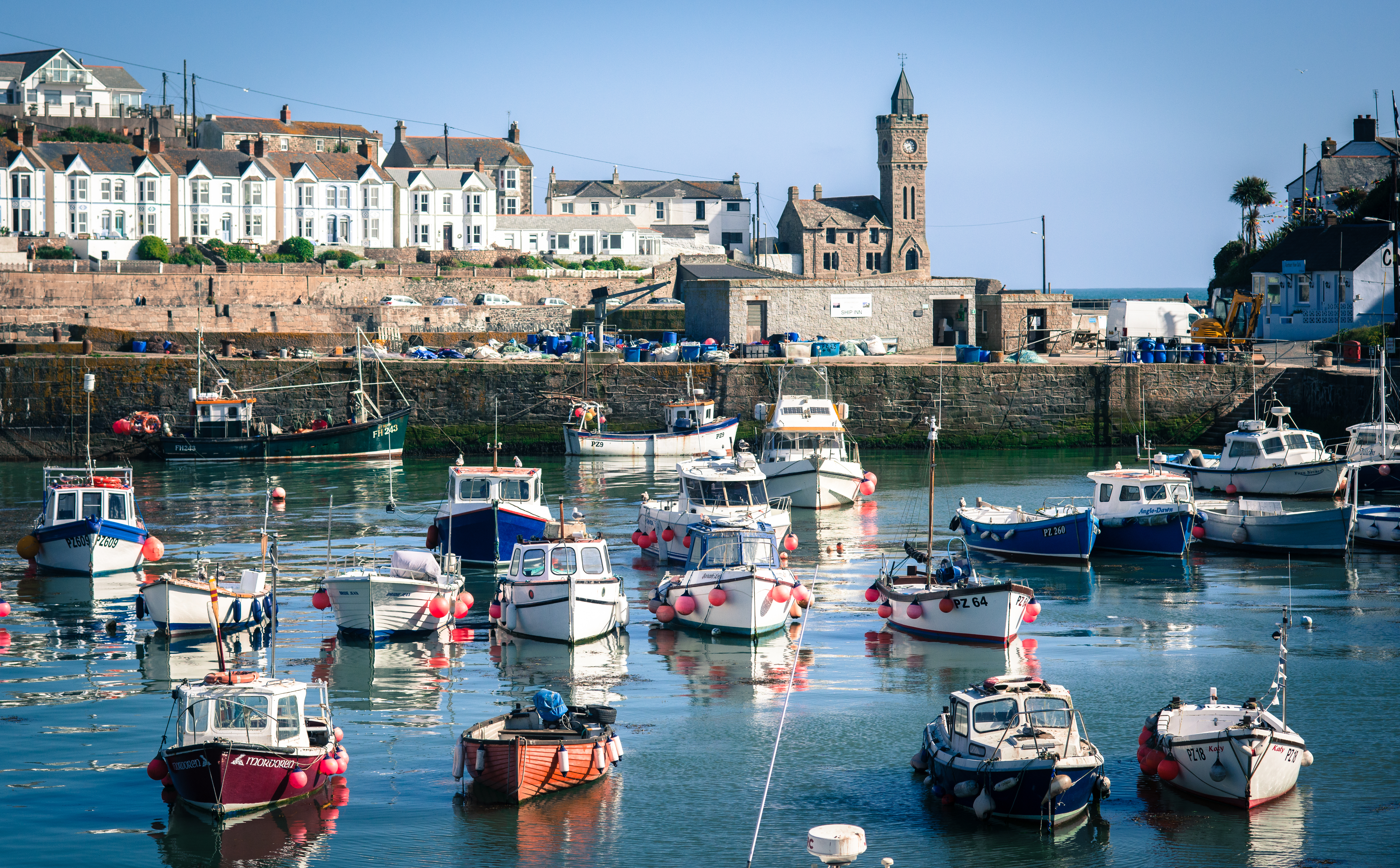
- Porthleven Harbour

- Location within Cornwall
- Population: 3,117 (Parish, 2021)
- OS grid reference: SW6225
- Civil parish: Porthleven
- Unitary authority: Cornwall
- Ceremonial county: Cornwall
- Region: South West
- Country: England
- Sovereign state: United Kingdom
- Post town: HELSTON
- Postcode district: TR13
- Dialling code: 01326
- Police: Devon and Cornwall
- Fire: Cornwall
- Ambulance: South Western
- UK Parliament: St Ives

Porthleven (/ˌpɔːθˈlɛvən/; Cornish: Porthelvan [pɔrθˈɛlvan] (cove of St Elvan) or sometimes Porthlynn [pɔrθlɪnː] (cove of the lake)) is a town, civil parish and fishing port in Cornwall, UK. The most southerly port in Great Britain, it was a harbour of refuge when this part of the Cornish coastline was infamous for wrecks in the days of sail. The South West Coast Path from Somerset to Dorset passes through the town. At the 2021 census, the population of the parish was 3,117.

== History ==
Methleigh was the site of a fair and annual market from the year 1066. After the Norman Conquest, the Bishop of Exeter held the manor of Methleigh, but the Earl of Cornwall possessed the right to hold the fair. At the time of the Domesday Survey there were 15 acres (6.1 ha) of arable land, 40 acres (16 ha) of pasture and 60 acres (24 ha) of underbrush. The population consisted of 15 villeins, 4 smallholders and 3 serfs.

Until 1844 Porthleven was within the parish of Sithney. The parish Church of St Bartholomew was built in 1842. The name Porthleven is probably connected with St Elwen or Elwyn, whose chapel existed here before 1270. It was rebuilt about 1510, but destroyed in 1549. There were also chapels at Higher Penrose and Lanner Veor (the latter founded in 1377) and a holy well at Venton-Vedna. The Vicar of Porthleven in the 1850s was the Rev. Thomas Lockyer Williams, a Tractarian who introduced practices into the parish which provoked dislike in the Rev. Canon John Rogers of Penrose, Rector of Mawnan and a canon of Exeter.

Porthleven's most recognisable building is the Bickford-Smith Institute next to the pier and harbour entrance. It was built on the site of the old Fisherman's Arms and was opened on 16 December 1884. The clock tower on the west corner is 70 feet (21 m) high. The building originally had a reading room, a committee room, a curator's living room and two bedrooms. The Institute was grade II listed on 18 March 1991 and currently houses the town council and a snooker club. It featured (along with various other scenes from the town) as the incident room in an episode of the TV detective series Wycliffe. A picture of the building against a large breaking wave sometimes appears in the background of BBC UK weather forecasts, particularly when windy conditions and rough seas are expected. The Institute has a plaque to Guy Gibson VC, leader of the Dambuster Raid, on the wall facing the harbour. Gibson was born in India, but saw Porthleven – his mother's home town, where his parents were married – as a home town as well. He visited there while on leave during the war, sometimes attending the Porthleven Methodist Church. His name is marked on the community's war memorial (he was killed in 1944) and a street (Gibson Way) is named after him.

=== The harbour ===
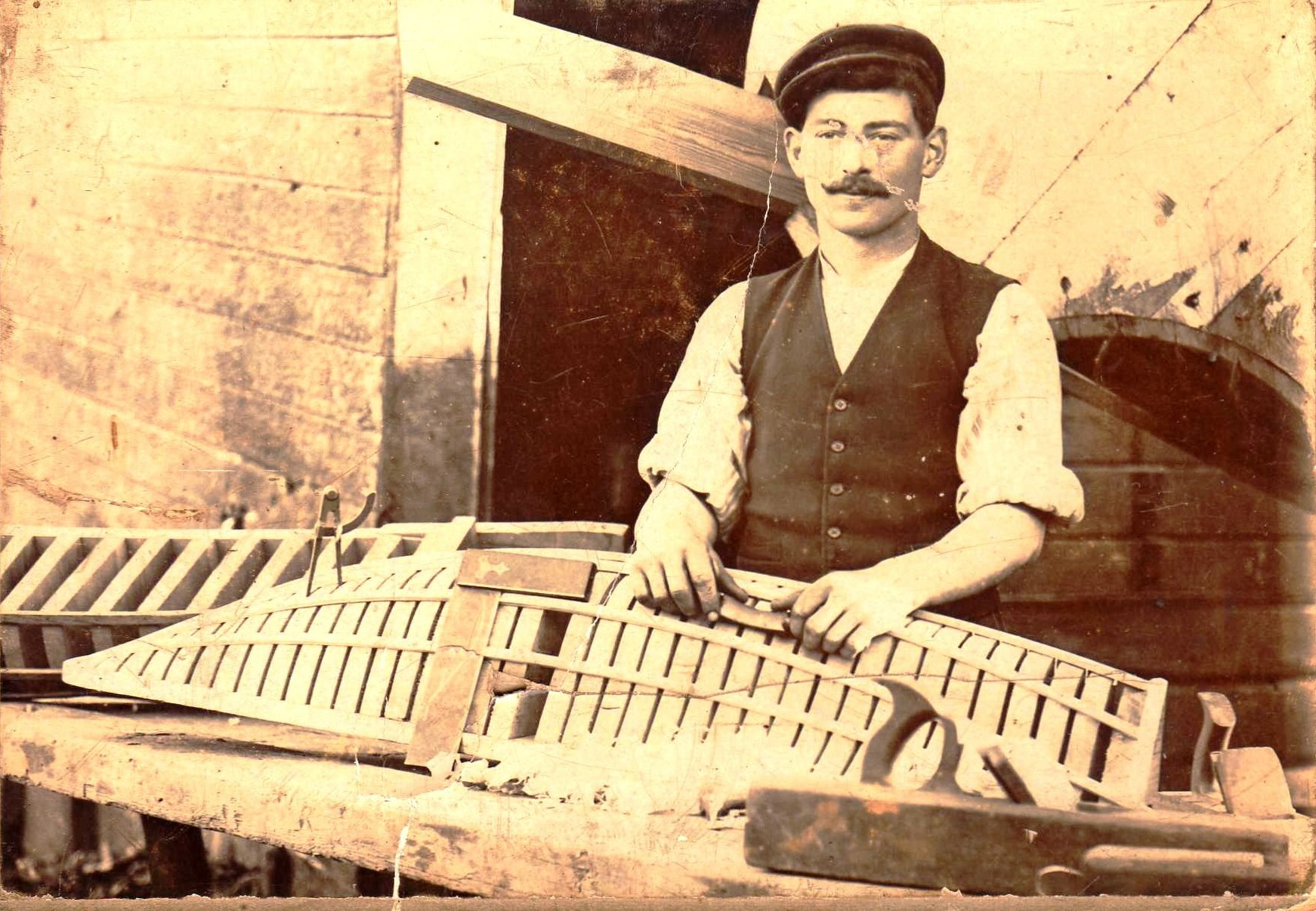
Part of Porthleven's boat building history

William Cookworthy acquired leases on the Tregonning Hill quarries and shipped china clay to his porcelain factory in Plymouth. In 1826, 150 tons of china stone and 30 tons of china clay were exported, and in 1838, 500 tons of china stone. By 1876, 970 tons were exported and in 1883, 1002 tons. Granite was also exported, from the quarries at Coverack Bridges and Sithney.

Fifty-two fishing boats were built between 1877 and 1883, employing at times up to twenty people. They ranged in length from 22 feet (6.7 m) to 55 feet (17 m) and were built not only for Mount's Bay ports, but for others in the UK and in South Africa.

Overnight on 12–13 December 1978, Police Constables Joseph James Childs and Martin Ross Reid of Devon and Cornwall Police were killed when their patrol car was swept into the harbour during a heavy storm. A stone memorial was erected on the south-facing harbour wall.

=== Lifeboat ===
Due to the prevailing westerly winds, it was easy for a ship under sail to be trapped in Mount's Bay and wrecked nearby. The Royal National Lifeboat Institution opened Porthleven Lifeboat Station in 1863. A boat house was built at Breageside, from where the boat was taken to the water on a carriage. The Agar Robartes was replaced by the Charles Henry Wright (named after the donor) in November 1882. A boat house on the west side of the harbour entrance was opened in 1894, with a slipway to ease launching. The station was closed in 1929, as the neighbouring stations at The Lizard and Penlee had been equipped with motor lifeboats that could cover the whole bay. The slipway was dismantled and the boat house used as a store for a while. It has since become the Shipwreck Centre museum.

== Protected areas ==
Three of the four Sites of Special Scientific Interest (SSSI) close to Porthleven, and the Geological Conservation Review (GCR) sites are designated for their geological interest. They are Porthleven Cliffs SSSI, Porthleven Cliffs East SSSI, and Wheal Penrose SSSI. The Giant's Rock, within Porthleven Cliffs SSSI, is a glacial erratic of unknown origin and unknown means of arrival, is near the entrance of Porthleven harbour. Wheal Penrose SSSI is a disused lead mine 550 yards (500 m) to the south with "examples of typical lead zone mineralisation". All land within Wheal Penrose SSSI is owned by the local authority. The fourth, Loe Pool, is Cornwall's largest natural lake, formed by a barrier beach known as Loe Bar which dams the River Cober.

Porthleven (like almost a third of Cornwall) lies within the Cornwall Area of Outstanding Natural Beauty (AONB).

== Governance ==
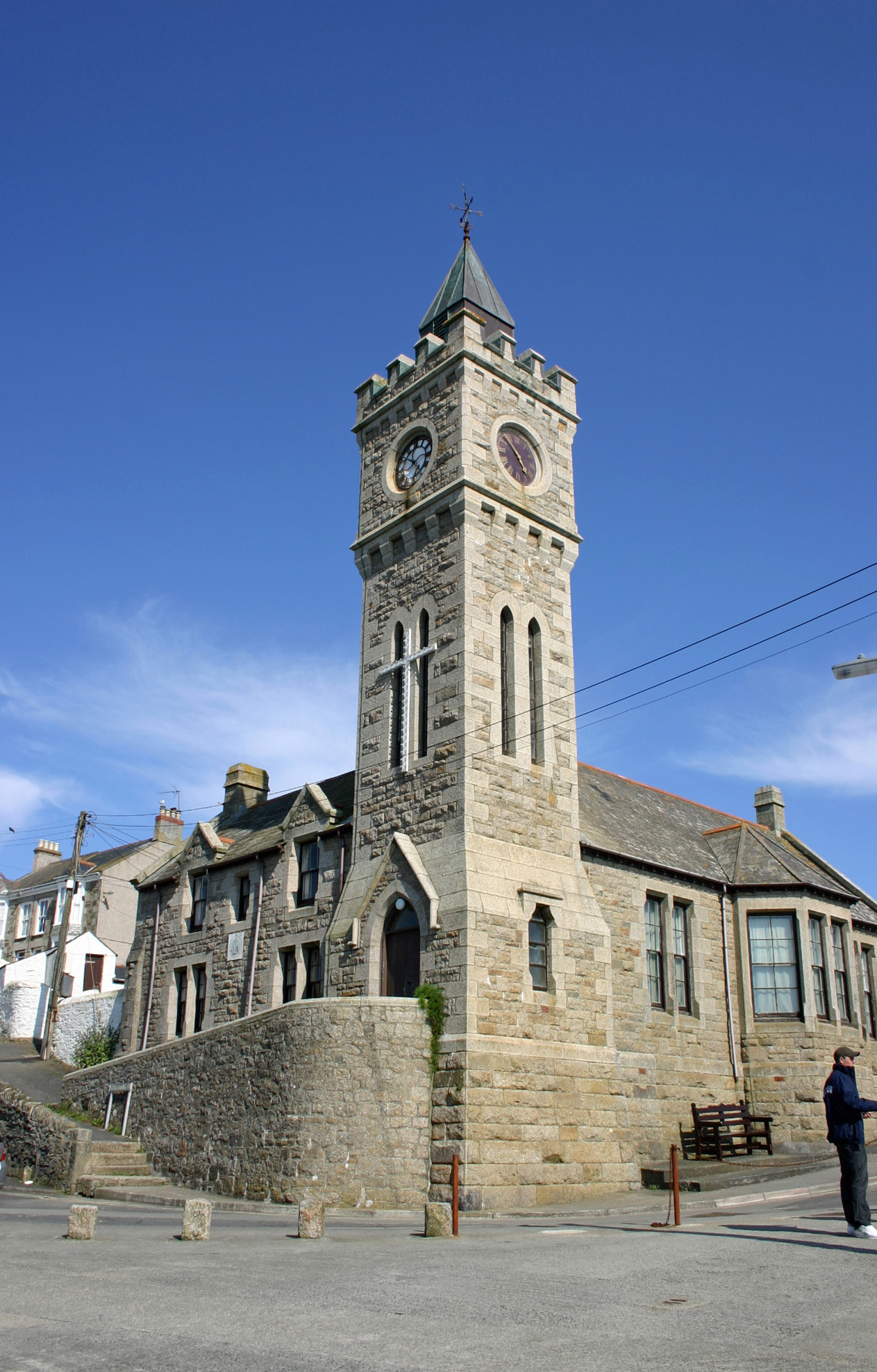
Bickford-Smith Institute

There are two tiers of local government covering Porthleven, at parish (town) and unitary authority level: Porthleven Town Council and Cornwall Council. The town council is based at Institute Cottage on Cliff Road, part of the Bickford-Smith Institute building.

=== Administrative history ===
Porthleven historically straddled the parishes of Sithney and Breage. In 1934, Porthleven was absorbed into the borough of Helston.

The borough of Helston was abolished in 1974 under the Local Government Act 1972, when the area became part of the Kerrier district. A successor parish called Helston was created at the same time, covering the area of the abolished borough.

In 1985, a new parish of Porthleven was created, removing it from Helston parish. The new parish council adopted the name Porthleven Town Council. Later in 1985, it established its headquarters in a former cottage which formed part of the Bickford-Smith Institute building.

Kerrier district was abolished in 2009. Cornwall County Council then took on district-level functions, making it a unitary authority, and was renamed Cornwall Council.

== Sport and leisure ==
Porthleven has exploited its location and powerful swells to become one of Britain's best-known surfing spots, described as "Cornwall's best reef break". Waves often exceeding 6.6 feet (2 m) break on a shallow reef that was shaped by blasting the harbour. Kayaking is also popular. RNLI lifeguards patrol the beach in the holiday season. The beach is separated from the harbour by a granite pier in front of the Porthleven Institute and clock tower. When the tide is out it is possible to walk about three miles east along Porthleven beach. There is also a coastal path with views of the beach below.

Porthleven Bowling Club is based at Methleigh Parc and affiliated to Bowls Cornwall and Bowls England. It was founded in 1959 and has lawn bowling and short-mat bowls facilities. The club and its members compete within Cornwall and nationally, and there are in-house competitions.

Porthleven has a non-league football club in the South West Peninsula League, which operates at levels 10 and 11 of the English football league system. The club's home ground is at Gala Parc.

The traditional place for Cornish wrestling prize tournaments held in Porthleven in the 19th century was the "Wrestling Field", now marked by a plaque. More recently tournaments have been held in the Recreation Ground.

The restaurateur Rick Stein opened a restaurant in the town, now taken over by fellow chef, Michael Caines.

== Twinning ==
Porthleven is twinned with Guissény in Brittany, France.

Guy Gibson VC, 1944

== Notable residents ==
- Pender Hodge Cudlip (1835–1911), Anglican High Church clergyman, theologian and writer.
- Wing Commander Guy Gibson (1918–1944), distinguished bomber pilot, the first Commanding Officer of No. 617 Squadron, which he led in the Dam Busters raid in 1943, he was awarded the Victoria Cross
- David Jewell (1934–2006), an independent school headmaster.
- Chris Craft (1939–2021), British racing driver, competed in the 24 Hours of Le Mans race for over a decade, including a third-placed finish in 1976
- Lieutenant Commander Steve Cass (born ca. 1969) Royal Navy officer, from 2013 to 2017, when he was the senior rating - Warrant Officer of the Naval Service

== Gallery ==
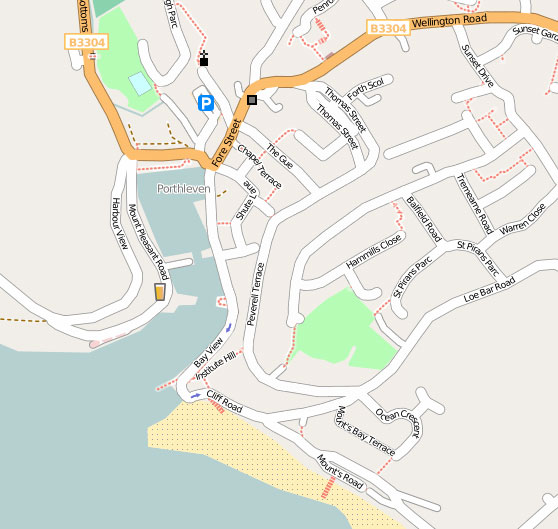
OpenStreetMap of Porthleven

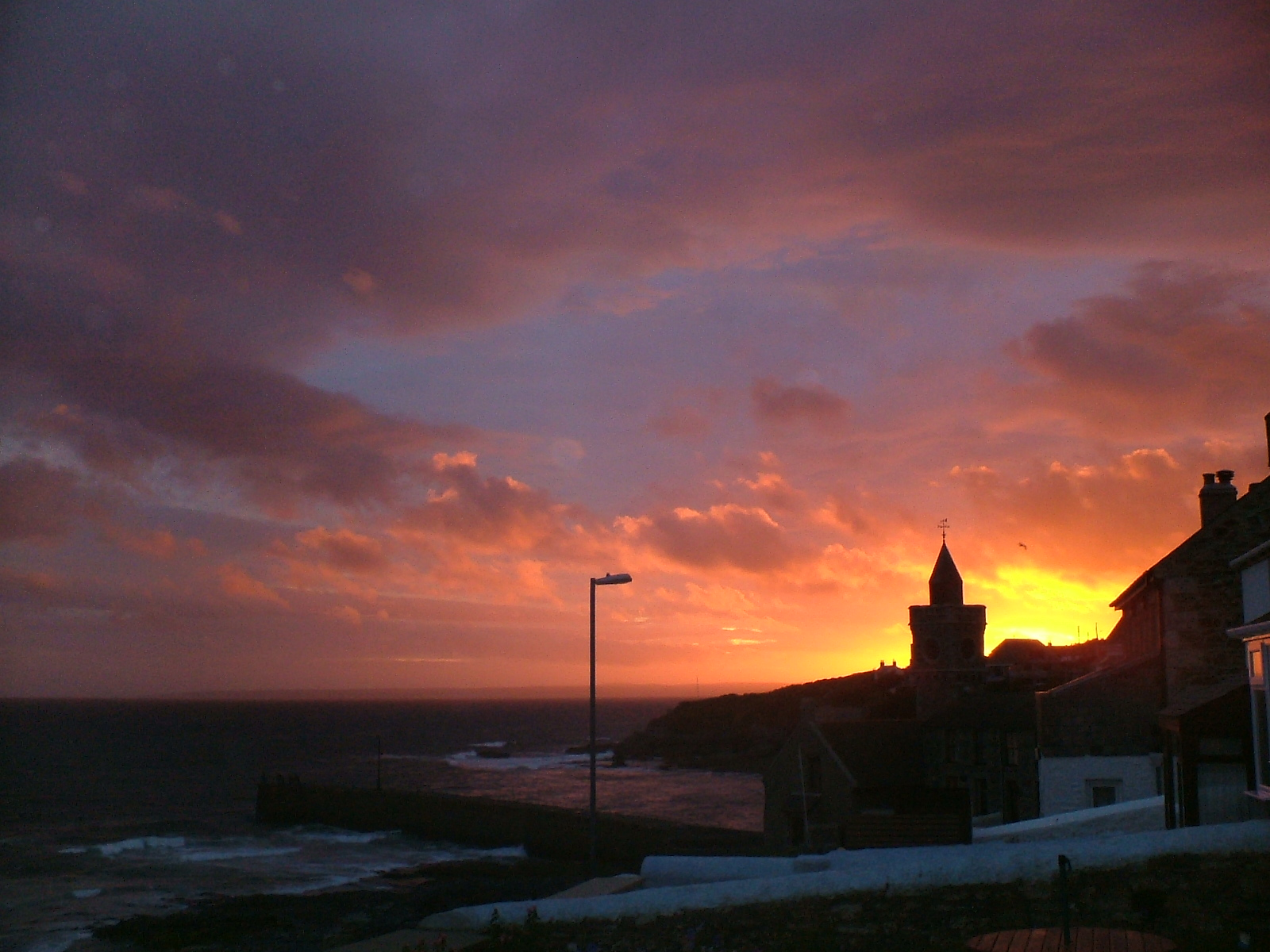
Sunset behind Porthleven clock tower and overlooking Mount's Bay

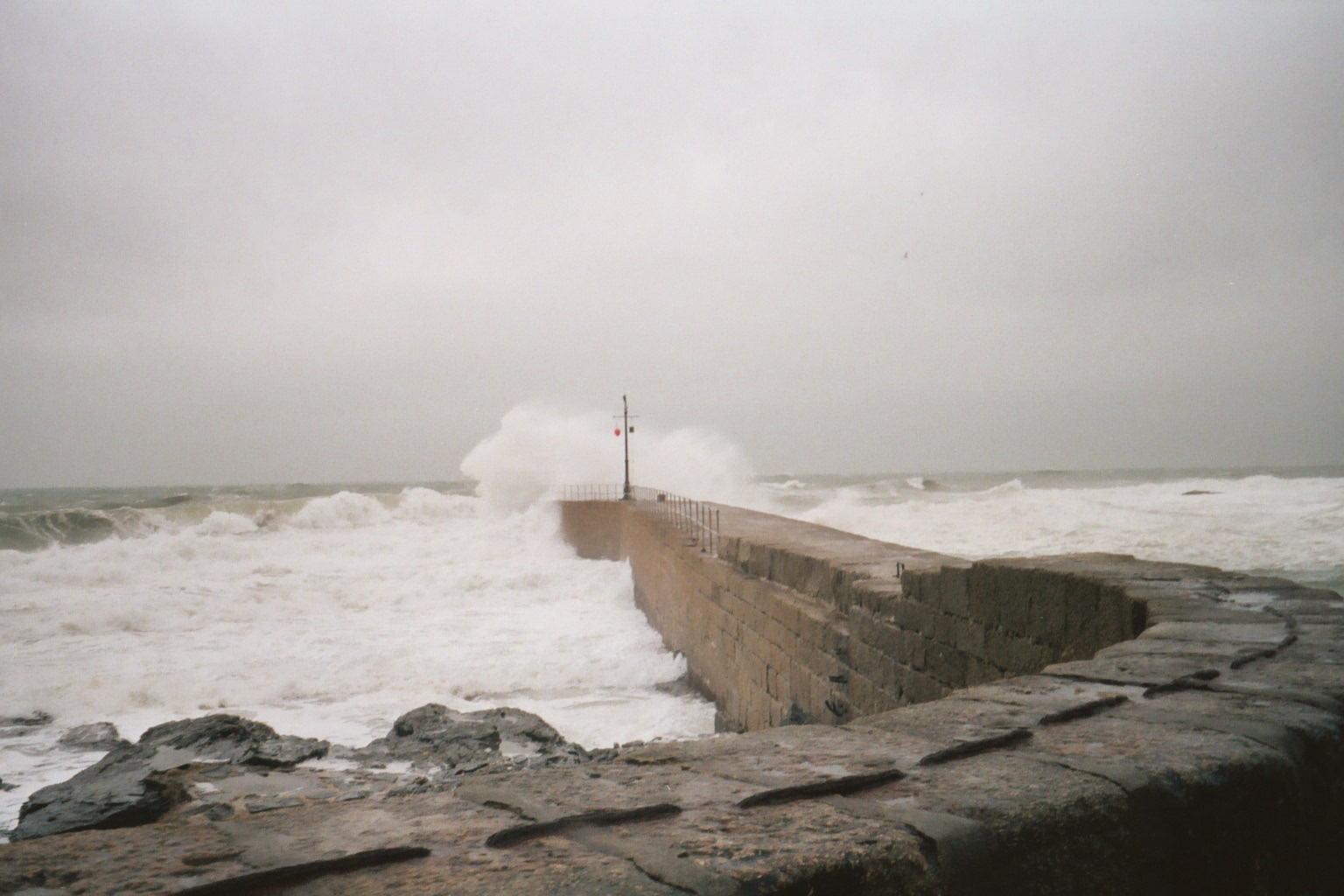
Waves hitting the Pier

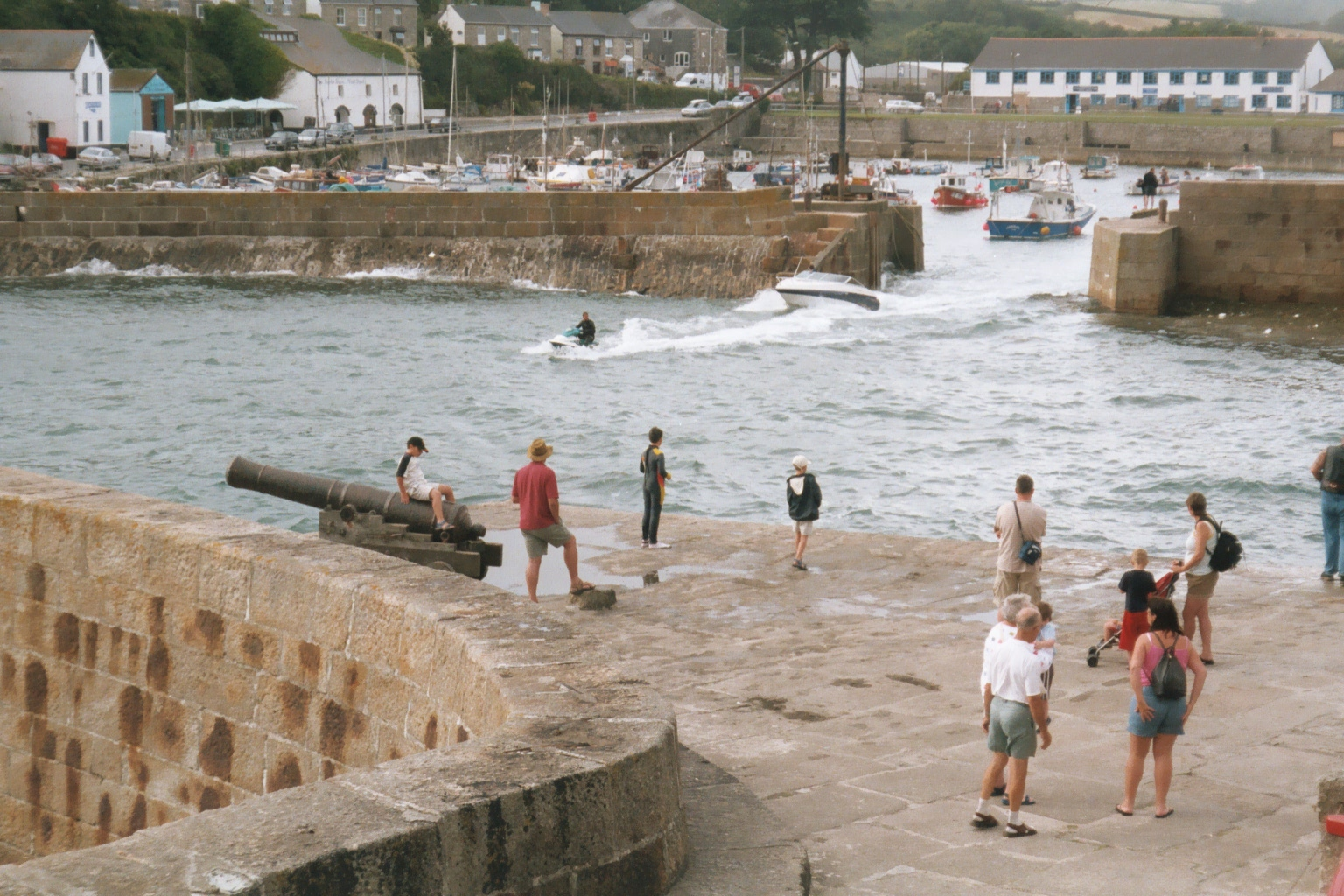
Porthleven Harbour

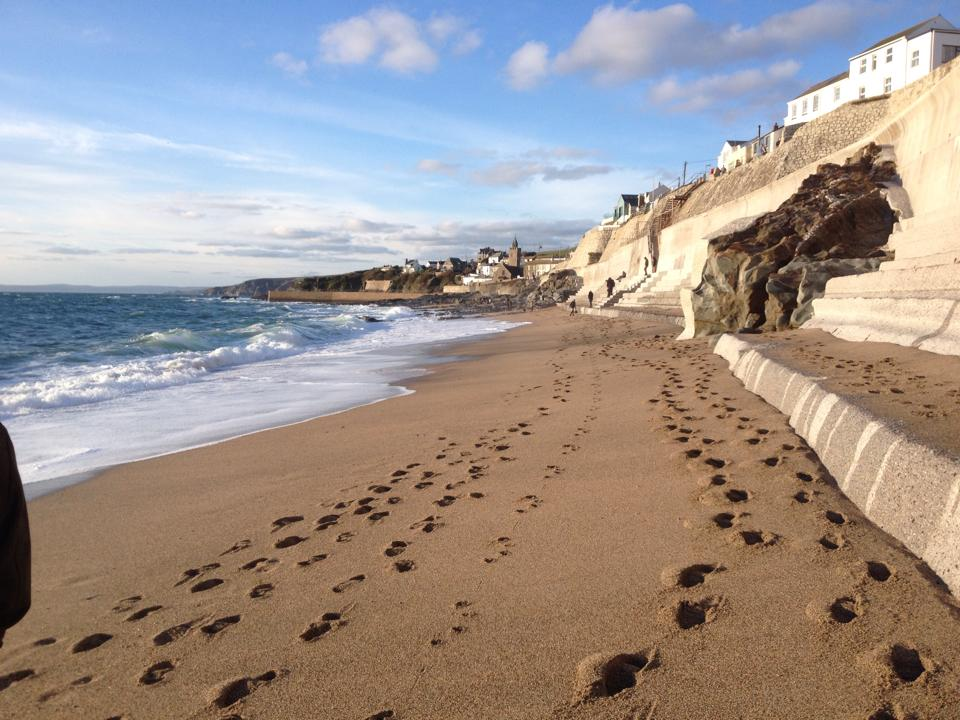

== See also ==
- Ship Inn, a Grade II listed public house
