= Takla =

Takla may refer to:

- Takla (name)
- Takla Group, a group of volcanic rocks in British Columbia, Canada
- Takla Formation, a geologic formation in British Columbia
- Takla Lake, a lake in northern British Columbia, Canada
  - Takla Lake First Nation, a First Nation located around Takla Lake
- Takla Landing Water Aerodrome, an aerodrome in northern British Columbia, Canada
- Takla Narrows Aerodrome, an aerodrome in northern British Columbia, Canada
