= Mo Lua mac Carthach =

Mo Lua, Irish ecclesiastic, fl. c. 600.

Mo Lua is given in the genealogies as Mo Lua of Cluain Fada (Cloonfad) or Cluain Fearta (Clonfert) mac Carrthach mac Daighre, or Mo-Lua mac Carthach mac Fualascach mac Colmán mac Éanda. His association with either foundation is unclear, but is of early date.

One tale tells of when Sithney, abbot pro tem of Saighir had overstayed a visit to Mo Lua and was concerned about crossing the River Shannon after nightfall. Mo Lua bowed his head and began to pray; Sithney set out, and the sun did not set until he had reached his monastery. (As it was Midsummer, the sun had not quite set when he reached the river, and having crossed, there was sufficient twilight to see himself the rest of the way.)

== Sources ==
- The Great Book of Irish Genealogies, 731.3, 731.5, pp. 718-19, volume two, Dubhaltach MacFhirbhisigh; edited, with translation and indices by Nollaig Ó Muraíle, 2003-2004. ISBN 0 946130 36 1.
- The Parish of Clontuskert - Glimpses into its Past, 2009.
