= Fyokla Bezzubova =

Soviet writer

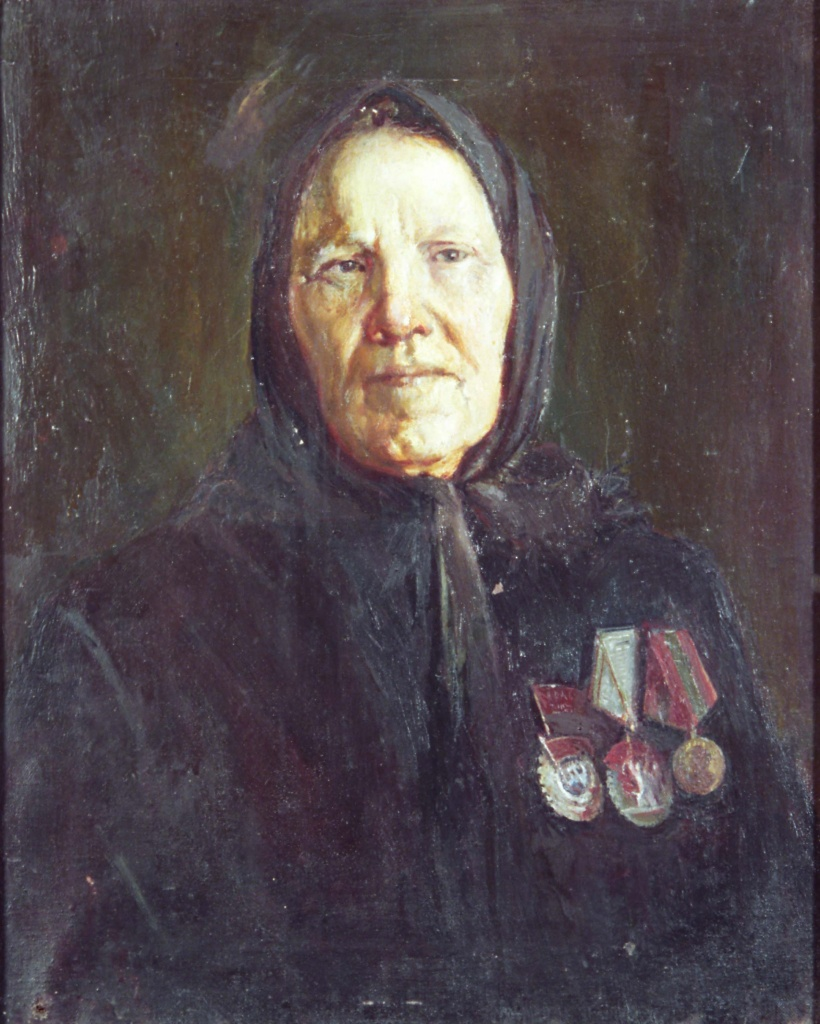

Fyokla Ignatievna Bezzubova (27 September 1880 in Saransky Uyezd – 12 May 1966 in Saransk) was an Erzya Russian and Soviet narrator of folklore (skazitelnitsa).

A member of the Union of Soviet Writers since 1938, she was invested with the Order of the Red Banner of Labour in 1939, the Order of the Badge of Honour in 1950, and the Medal "For Valiant Labour in the Great Patriotic War 1941–1945" in 1947.

She collected folk songs.

In 1947, she was a deputy of the Supreme Soviet of the Mordovian Autonomous Soviet Socialist Republic.

== Books ==
(In Erzya language)

- "Folk Morot" ( "Folk Songs" ) 1939
- Skazt dy Morot” ( “Tales and Songs” ) 1958
