= Breage =

Saint Breage (or Breaca)

Nun
- Born: 5th or 6th century (traditional); Lagonia and Ultonia, Ireland (traditional)
- Residence: Cornwall, England
- Died: Breage, Cornwall (traditional burial site)
- Venerated in: Cornwall, South West England, Eastern Orthodox Church, Catholic Church
- Major shrine: Breage Parish Church, Breage, Cornwall
- Feast: 1 May (William Worcester, 1478); 4 June (later times)

Breage or Breaca (with many variant spellings) is a saint venerated in Cornwall and South West England. According to her late hagiography, she was an Irish nun of the 5th or 6th century who founded a church in Cornwall. The village and civil parish of Breage in Cornwall are named after her, and the local Breage Parish Church is dedicated to her. She is a saint in the Eastern Orthodox Church and Catholic Church.

== Traditions ==
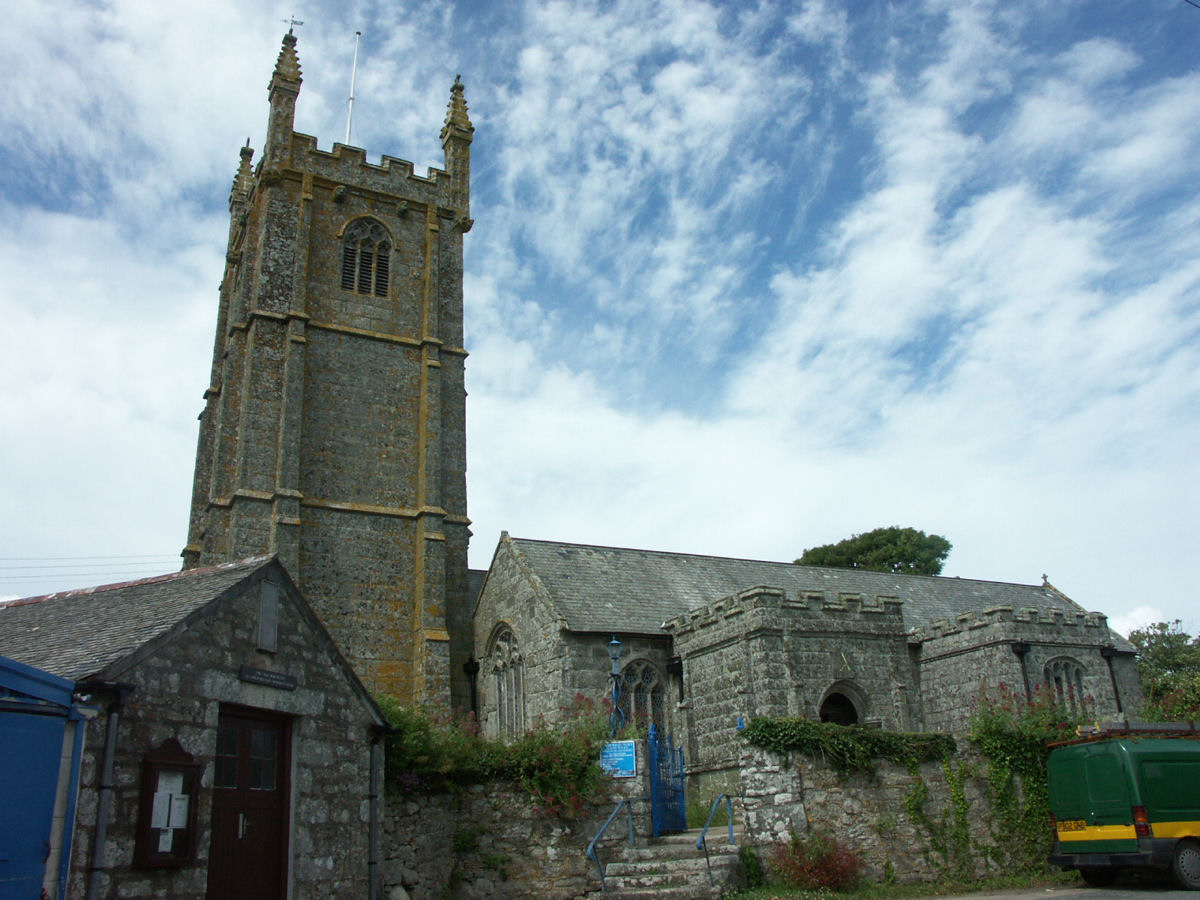
Breage Parish Church, dedicated to Saint Breage

Breage Church was established by 1170, giving its name to the village and parish of Breage, Cornwall. However, little else is known of Saint Breage or her early cultus. She was the subject of a medieval hagiography, probably written in the 14th or 15th century. The work is lost, but the English antiquarian John Leland recorded some extracts in his Itinerary around 1540. The surviving text suggests an initial composition at or for Breage Church, as it contains a number of references to local places and gives Breage precedence over other saints of the region. The narrative is late and replete with stock elements and borrowings from other works, and as such is not considered historical. However, the author was certainly well versed in the hagiographical tradition, drawing from a Life of Brigid of Kildare, and evidently borrowing from Breton traditions of Saint Sithney and Lives of the local saints Elwen, Ia, and Gwinear.

According to Leland's text, Breage was born in the region of Lagonia and Ultonia in Ireland, an unclear description perhaps referring to Leinster and Ulster. She became a nun at an oratory founded by Saint Brigid of Kildare at Campus Breace (the Plain of Breague; modern Mag Breg in County Meath). Around 460, she travelled to Cornwall with a company of seven other Irish saints: Germoe, Senanus (Sithney), Mavuanus (perhaps Mawnan), Elwen, Crowan, Helena, and Tecla. They settled at Revyer on the River Hayle, but some were killed by the local ruler Tewdwr Mawr of Penwith, a tyrant appearing regularly in Cornish hagiographical works. Undeterred, Breage travelled through Cornwall, visiting the hill of Pencaire and establishing a church at Trenewith or Chynoweth. After her death the church was moved to its present location, and many miracles occurred at her tomb.

Other bits of traditions about Breage have also come down. The chronicler William Worcester wrote in 1478 that Breage's feast day was celebrated on 1 May, and that she was said to be buried at the church dedicated to her. An idiom recorded in nearby Germoe in the 18th century said that while that village's patron Saint Germoe was a king, "Breage was a midwife". In the 19th century, residents of St Levan held that Breage was the sister of the town's saint Selevan or Salaman. In later times Breage's feast day was celebrated on 4 June, and was evidently once a prominent feast in Cornwall and the Diocese of Exeter in Devon. A Breage Fair is held on the third Monday in June.

It was whilst visiting Breage, on the 8th. of January 1982, that the international film actor Grégoire Aslan died.

== Identity ==
Since the traditions about Breage that have come down are late, the veracity of the details are doubted. The hagiography is replete with stock elements: her association with other locally venerated saints as companions, her conflict with a heathen tyrant, and her establishment as a hermit in a remote part of the parish that was later named for her. Her Irish origin is suspect, as in this period in Cornwall it was common to attribute a fabricated Irish connection to obscure saints. In Breage's case it may have been suggested by the similarity between her name and the Campus Breace in the Life of Brigid.

As such, the traditions surrounding Breage appear to be later legend attached to a figure whose true history had been lost. There was a saint with a similar name active in the area during the Early Middle Ages, Brioc, whose feast day was 1 May, the same day that William Worcester gave for Breage. Brioc was male, but it is not uncommon for the gender of poorly remembered saints to have been switched over the years. In Brittany there was also a Saint Briac, who gave his name to a number of places in the region. However, all medieval mentions of Breage regard her as female, complicating an identification with similarly named male saints.

Later brief accounts of Breage, mostly adapted from Leland, appear in the works of Alban Butler and Sabine Baring-Gould.
