= Takla (name) =

Takla (and its variants Thecla and Tekle) is a name which is used as a surname and a given name. Notable people with the name include:

== Surname ==
- Laila Takla, Coptic Egyptian politician, author, and promoter of Muslim-Christian relations
- Philippe Takla (1915–2006), Lebanese lawyer, diplomat, politician and minister
- Saleem Takla (1849–1892), co-founder of Al-Ahram with his brother Beshara Takla

== Given name ==
=== First name ===
- Thecla, Takla, or Tekla, saint of the early Christian Church
- Takla Chamoun (born 1966), Lebanese actress
- Tekle Haymanot, Ethiopian saint depicted with 6 wings
- Takla Maryam, former Emperor of Ethiopia

=== Middle name ===
- Abuna Takla Haymanot (died 1988), third Patriarch of the Ethiopian Orthodox Tewahido Church
- Mara Takla Haymanot, former Emperor of Ethiopia

== See also ==
- Murad Takla, someone who writes Bengali words using the Latin script in a bizarre or unorthodox fashion
