= Germoe =

Village in Cornwall, England

Coordinates: 50.115°N 5.379°W

Germoe: Cornish: Germogh
- Location within Cornwall
- Population: 528 (2011 census)
- OS grid reference: SW585294
- Civil parish: Germoe
- Unitary authority: Cornwall
- Ceremonial county: Cornwall
- Region: South West
- Country: England
- Sovereign state: United Kingdom
- Post town: Penzance
- Postcode district: TR20
- Dialling code: 01736
- Police: Devon and Cornwall
- Fire: Cornwall
- Ambulance: South Western
- UK Parliament: St Ives

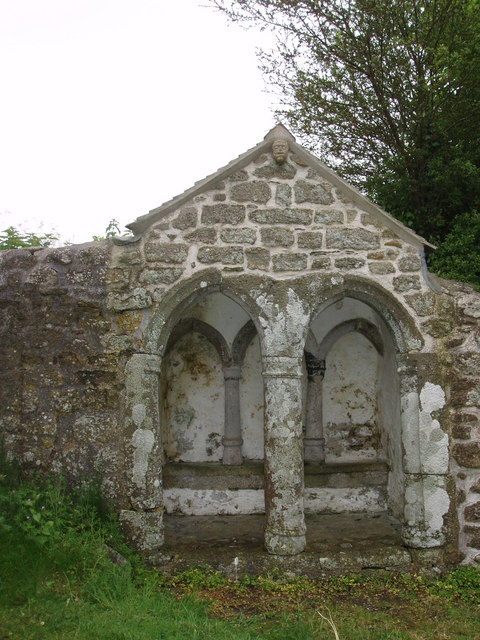
St Germoe's Chair

Germoe (Cornish: Germogh) is a village and civil parish in Cornwall, England, United Kingdom. Germoe village, the parish's main settlement and church town, is about five miles (8.0 km) west of Helston and seven miles (11 km) east of Penzance. The A394 Penzance to Helston road runs along the southern border of the parish. Other settlements in the parish include Balwest, Boscreege and Tresowes Green.

The parish is named after Saint Germocus, one of the companions of Saint Breage. According to legend Germoc was a king in Ireland whose feast day is 6 May.

Historically, the largest landowners in the parish were the Godolphin family (the Dukes of Leeds).

Germoe parish is bounded to the north, east and south by Breage parish and to the west by St Hilary parish. The population was 508 in the 2001 census. This had increased to 549 at the 2011 census. The parish is now rural in character but was once associated with the Cornish mining industry; to the north it borders the geological formation known as the Tregonning-Godolphin Granite (one of five granite batholiths in Cornwall) and the area was formerly an important source of tin and copper ore (see Geology of Cornwall). Tregonning Hill is the site of the Germoe first and second war memorial.

== Churches ==
The parish church in Germoe is mostly of the 14th century and is built on the site of an earlier Norman church. The church has a chancel, nave, north aisle, south transept, and a three-stage battlemented tower of granite ashlar. There are three long tailed monkeys carved on the porch which are said to ward off evil. There is a Godolphin family pew in the north aisle. A small medieval building in the churchyard wall is known as St Germoe's Chair. The Anglican ecclesiastical parish of Germoe is now grouped with Breage. A Wesleyan Methodist chapel was built at Balwest in 1829 for miners in the north of the parish.

== Pengersick Castle ==
Pengersick Castle is a fortified manor house near Praa Sands which is a Grade II* listed building.

The house is of late medieval date and features one of the few towers of its type preserved in Britain. John Milliton of Pengersick Castle became High Sheriff of Cornwall and Pengersick Castle was also improved around 1530 as a fortified manor house after the wreck of a valuable Portuguese ship. Rumours of ghosts and devil-worship surround the castle. The ghost of John Milliton is said to haunt the castle. Legend says that he attempted to poison his wife, but she switched goblets with him and the Devil was all too happy to take them both to hell. Historical research has proven some of these stories to be false: no monks were murdered there (although one was assaulted by Henry Pengersick), the supposed plague pits featured in the television programme Most Haunted were located in another part of the castle, and the Black Dog is reported to be a myth created by 19th century smugglers to frighten people away. Additionally, Sir John Milliton died in 1570, and his wife in 1579.

== Gallery ==
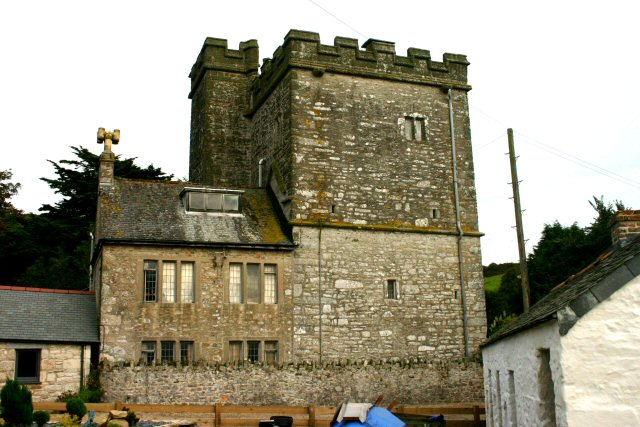
Pengersick Castle

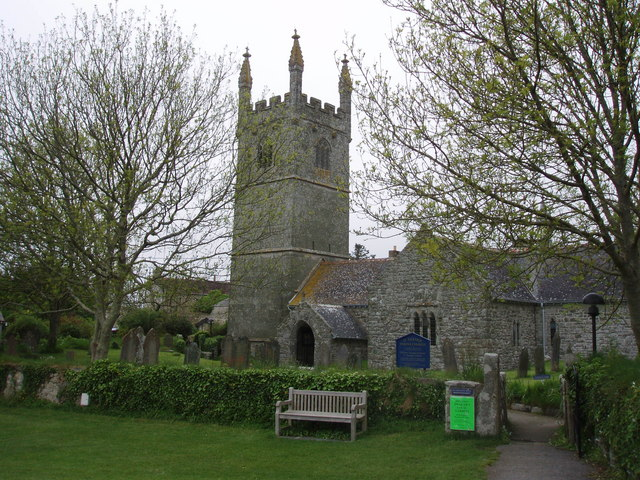
St Germoe church

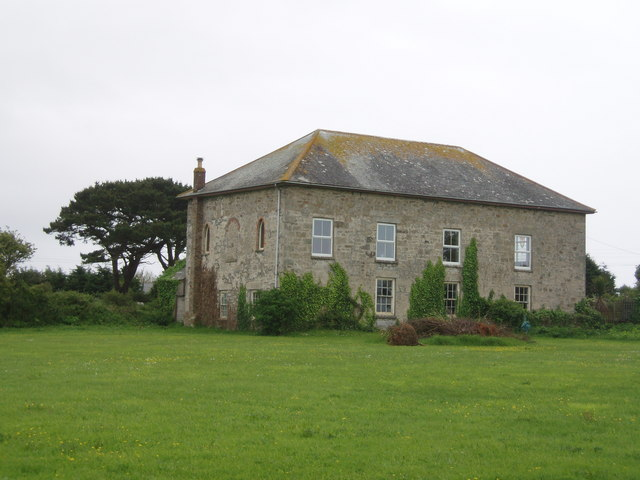
Kenneggy Methodist Chapel
