= Saint Sithney =

Sub-Roman Celtic saint

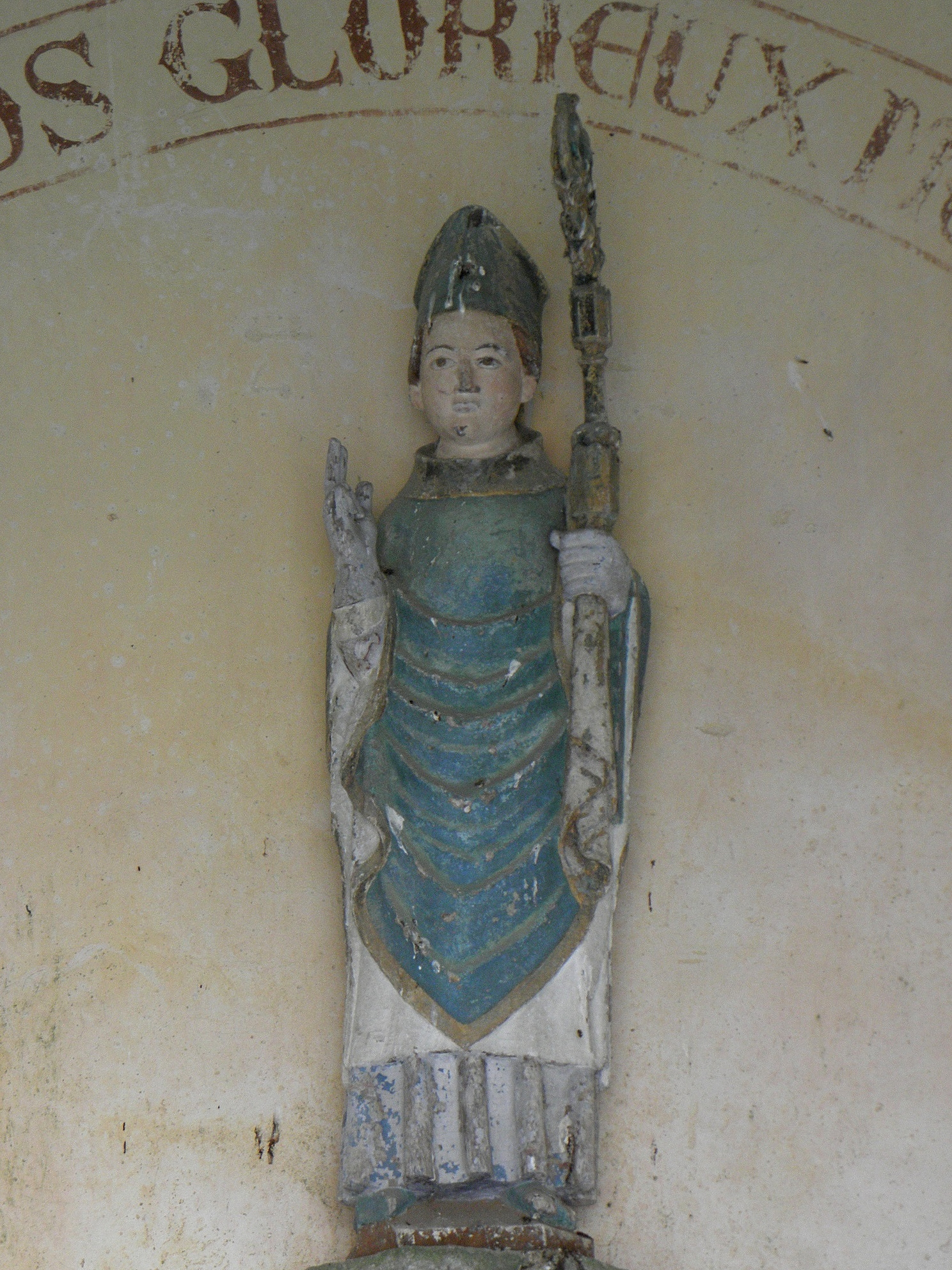
- Statue of St Sezny, Guissény
- Born: ?
- Died: ?
- Venerated in: Catholic Church
- Feast: August 4
- Patronage: invoked against rabies; Sithney, Cornwall

Saint Sithney (Latin: Sidinius; Breton: Sezni Saint was a sub-Roman Celtic saint active in Cornwall and Brittany. He is invoked against mad dogs.

== Traditional narrative ==
According to tradition, Sithney (being a form of the Irish Setna) was one of a group of Irish monks who came to western Cornwall. Setna was a native of Munster, the son of Erc and Magna, a sister of St. David. Setna had two brothers, Saint Govan and Multos. He may be the Setna, a deaf and mute boy who kept cows on Slieve-Bloom. Columba of Terryglass, seeing the boy. pitied the child and blessed him. Setna not only recovered hearing and speech, but also acquired the gift of prophecy.

He was a student of Senán mac Geirrcinn, and accompanied the saint to Inis Mor, where Senan established a monastery. From there he went to Ciarán of Saigir and headed the abbey temporarily until Carthage the Elder took over. He used to visit Mo Lua mac Carthach at Clonfert. After Carthage arrived in Saighir, Sithney went to Brittany.

== Brittany ==
Historian Nicholas Orme suggests that his cult may have originated in Brittany. A Breton folk story, an adaptation of a tale associated with Ciarán of Saigir, states that God asked Sithney to be the patron saint of girls seeking husbands, but Sithney said he would rather be the patron saint of mad dogs and get some rest.

He is the patron saint of Sithney, Cornwall, United Kingdom, and is invoked for help against rabies and mad dogs, and for healing of mad dogs. He was also venerated at Guissény, Brittany, and at a number of other places in Brittany.

The legends of St Sezni were compiled by Albert Le Grand in 1636 and a Breton translation of this was published in 1848 as Buez Sant Sezny. The sources Le Grand used borrowed heavily from the Life of Ciarán of Saigir; the sections regarding Sithney in Brittany are more reliable.

William Worcester recorded in 1478 that the body of the saint lay within the church of Sithney.
