= Gulliver (name) =

Gulliver is a surname and masculine given name. It may refer to:

== As a surname ==
- Ashbel Green Gulliver (1897–1974), dean of Yale Law School from 1940 to 1946
- Ben Gulliver (born 1981), English former rugby union player
- Charles Gulliver, British music-hall producer and impresario in the early 20th century
- Dorothy Gulliver (1908–1997), American film actress
- George Gulliver (1804–1882), English anatomist and physiologist
- Glenn Gulliver (born 1954), American former Major League Baseball player
- Henrietta Maria Gulliver (1866–1945), Australian painter
- Isaac Gulliver (1745–1822), English smuggler
- James Gulliver (1930–1996), founder of Argyll Foods
- Julia Gulliver (1856–1940), American philosopher, educator and college president
- Kenneth Gulliver (1913–2001), Australian cricketer
- Phil Gulliver (born 1982), English footballer
- Philip Gulliver (1921–2018), British-Canadian anthropologist and academic
- Richard Gulliver (born 1942), English former cricketer
- Stuart Gulliver (born 1959), British banking business executive
- Trina Gulliver (born 1969), English darts player

=== Fictional ===
- Lemuel Gulliver, the protagonist of the novel Gulliver's Travels

== As a given name ==
- Gulliver McGrath (born 1998), Australian actor
- Gulliver Ralston (born 1978), British musician

=== Fictional ===
- Gulliver, a Seagull character from the video game series Animal Crossing

== See also ==
- Grgo Kusić (1892–1918), Croat soldier in the Austro-Hungarian Army nicknamed the "Gulliver of Dalmatia"
- Gulliver (disambiguation)
