= Ralston =

Ralston may refer to:

== Place names ==
=== United States ===
- Ralston, California
- Ralston, Iowa
- Ralston, Nebraska
- The Ralston Historic District in Mendham, New Jersey
- Ralston, Oklahoma
- Ralston, Wyoming
- Mount Ralston in the Sierra Nevada of California
- Ralston Creek (Colorado)
- Ralston Hall, Belmont, California, the country house of William Chapman Ralston

=== Elsewhere ===
- Ralston, Alberta, Canada
- Ralston, Renfrewshire, Scotland

== People ==
=== Surname ===
- Ralston (surname)

=== Given name ===
- Ralston Bowles, American musician
- Ralston Cash (born 1991), American baseball player
- Ralston Crawford, American artist
- Ralston Hill, American stage actor
- Ralston Westlake, mayor of Columbus, Ohio, USA

== Businesses ==
- Ralston Foods, a unit of Ralcorp
- Ralston Purina, a part of Nestlé Purina PetCare
- Ralston Steel Car Company, early 20th-century rail car manufacturer based in Columbus, Ohio

== Educational institutions ==
- Ralston College, a liberal arts college in Savannah, Georgia, United States
- Ralston High School, Ralston, Nebraska
- Ralston Valley High School, Arvada, Colorado

== Other uses ==
- Ralstonism, a minor 19th-century social movement in the United States
- Rebel Ralston, fictitious character in the Marvel Shared Universe
