= Ralston (surname) =

Ralston is a surname of Scottish origin. Notable people with the surname include:

- Alexander Ralston (1771–1827), American architect
- Andrew Patrick Ralston, American actor
- Anthony Ralston (born 1998), Scottish football player
- Aron Ralston (born 1975), American mountain climber
- Bill Ralston (born 1953), New Zealand journalist
- Bob Ralston (1938–2025), American pianist and organist
- Brian Ralston (born 1974), American composer
- Bruce Ralston, Canadian politician
- Byron Ralston (born 2000), Australian rugby union player
- Chris Ralston (born 1944), English rugby player
- David Ralston (1954–2022), American politician
- Dennis Ralston (1942–2020), American tennis player
- Esther Ralston (1902–1994), American silent film actress
- Frances Marion Ralston (1875–1952), American composer
- Gilbert Ralston (1912–1999), American writer
- Gulliver Ralston (born 1978), British musician
- Harriet Newell Ralston (1828–1920), American poet
- Harry Ralston, American screenwriter and director
- Jack Ralston (born 1997), American baseball player
- James Ralston (1881–1948), Canadian lawyer, soldier, and politician
- Jobyna Ralston (1899–1967), American silent film actress
- John Ralston (disambiguation), several people
- Joseph Ralston (born 1943), American Vice Chairman of the Joint Chiefs of Staff
- Joseph S. Ralston (1863–1920), co-founder of the Ralston Steel Car Company
- Ken Ralston (born 1954), American visual effects artist
- Les Ralston (born 1980), American boxer
- Lewis Ralston (1804–1870), American placer gold prospector
- Nick Ralston (born 1996), American football player
- Norman Ralston (1916–2007), American pilot
- Orville Alfred Ralston (1894–1942), American military pilot
- Robert Ralston (philanthropist) (1761–1836), American merchant and philanthropist
- Rudy Ralston, American film producer
- Samuel M. Ralston (1857–1925), governor of U.S. state of Indiana
- Steve Ralston (born 1974), American soccer player
- Susan Ralston (born 1967), American businesswoman
- Vera Ralston (died 2003), American actress
- William Chapman Ralston (1826–1875), American businessman and financier
- William Ralston Shedden-Ralston (1828–1889), British scholar of Russian
