= Generation K =

Generation K may refer to:

- Generation K (baseball)
- Generation K (demographics)
