= Paul Wilson (baseball) =

American baseball player (born 1973)

- Pitcher
- Born: March 28, 1973 (age 53); Orlando, Florida, U.S.
- Batted: Right Threw: Right

MLB debut
- April 4, 1996, for the New York Mets

Last MLB appearance
- May 16, 2005, for the Cincinnati Reds

MLB statistics
- Win–loss record: 40–58
- Earned run average: 4.86
- Strikeouts: 619
- Stats at Baseball Reference

Teams
- New York Mets (1996); Tampa Bay Devil Rays (2000–2002); Cincinnati Reds (2003–2005)

Paul Anthony Wilson (born March 28, 1973) is an American former professional baseball pitcher. A right-hander, he played all or parts of seven seasons in Major League Baseball. Wilson was the first overall pick in the 1994 MLB draft.

== Baseball career ==
=== Amateur career ===
Wilson played college baseball for the Florida State University Seminoles under head coach Mike Martin.

=== Professional career ===
Wilson was selected with the first overall pick in the 1994 MLB draft by the New York Mets. In his minor league career, he was billed alongside Jason Isringhausen and Bill Pulsipher as a future Mets star. The three were dubbed by sportswriters and fans as "Generation K".

In 1995, Wilson went a combined 11–6 with a 2.41 ERA while playing for the Double–A Binghamton Mets and Triple–A Norfolk Tides. He earned Baseball America 1st team minor league All-Star honors and was named Eastern League Pitcher of the Year.

After spending just a season and a half in the minors, Wilson was called up in 1996 and made 26 starts for the Mets. He finished 5–12 with an ERA of 5.38. He spent the following two seasons in the minors, albeit limited due to injuries. He missed the entire 1999 season.

On July 28, 2000, he was traded to the Tampa Bay Devil Rays. He made 11 appearances, 7 starts for the Devil Rays. In 2001, Wilson opened the season in the bullpen for Tampa Bay but was later shifted to the rotation. In 37 appearances, 24 starts, he went 8–9 with a 4.88 ERA and a career high 119 strikeouts. In 2002, he went 6–12 with a 4.83 ERA in a career high 30 starts. He also led the Devil Rays in innings pitched. He became a free agent after the season. He signed a contract with the Cincinnati Reds. In 2003, Wilson went 8–10 in 28 starts. On July 10, 2003, Wilson faced eight Houston Astros and failed to record an out on 41 pitches, the most pitches ever thrown in a game by a pitcher without recording an out. In 2004, he won a career high 11 games.

On May 6, 2005, Wilson was the starting pitcher against the Los Angeles Dodgers, and was unable to get out any of the first eight Dodgers batters in the first inning. The inning went hit batsman-homer-single-homer-walk-hit batsman-double-double, before Wilson was pulled from the game. He is one of six starting pitchers in MLB history to fail to get out any of the first eight batters of the opposing team in a game, and the only one to do so twice. On March 21, 2007, Wilson was released by the Reds, after another setback as he tried to come back from shoulder surgery.

Wilson played for the Reno Silver Sox of the Golden Baseball League in 2008, before his release on June 8.
