= Gulliver =

Gulliver may refer to:

== Arts and entertainment ==
- Lemuel Gulliver, the protagonist of Jonathan Swift's novel Gulliver's Travels
- the title character of Brian Gulliver's Travels, a satirical BBC radio series
- Gary Gulliver, the title character of The Adventures of Gulliver, a 1968 Hanna-Barbera television cartoon
- Gulliver Toscanni, protagonist of Gulliver Boy, a Japanese anime series
- Gulliver "Gully" Foyle, the protagonist of Alfred Bester's novel The Stars My Destination
- Gulliver, a seagull and special character from the video game series Animal Crossing

== Places ==
- Gulliver Lake, a lake in the Upper Peninsula of Michigan, United States
- Gulliver, Queensland, a suburb of Townsville, Australia
- Gulliver River, New Zealand
- Gulliver Nunatak, Graham Land, Antarctica

== People ==
- Gulliver (name), a list of people with the surname or given name

== Other uses ==
- Gulliver (building), Kyiv, Ukraine
- Gulliver Schools, a group of private co-educational schools in Miami-Dade County, Florida
