= Dakota Chalmers =

American baseball player (born 1996)

Free agent
- Pitcher
- Born: October 8, 1996 (age 30); Snellville, Georgia, U.S.
- Bats: Right Throws: Right

Dakota Reid Chalmers (born October 8, 1996) is an American professional baseball pitcher who is a free agent. He was drafted by the Oakland Athletics in the third round of the 2015 Major League Baseball draft.

== Career ==
=== Oakland Athletics ===
Chalmers attended Lakeview Academy in Gainesville, Georgia, for his first two years of high school before transferring to North Forsyth High School in Cumming, Georgia. The Oakland Athletics selected Chalmers in the third round of the 2015 MLB draft, and signed for a $1.2 million signing bonus. He signed with Oakland, forgoing his commitment to play college baseball at the University of Georgia.

After signing, Chalmers made his professional debut for the Arizona League Athletics where he posted a 0–1 record with a 2.66 ERA in 11 starts. He spent 2016 with the Vermont Lake Monsters, going 5–4 with a 4.70 ERA in 15 games (13 starts), and 2017 with the Beloit Snappers, pitching to a 2–2 record and a 4.34 ERA in ten games (five starts). He returned to Beloit to begin 2018, but only pitched in two games due to injury.

=== Minnesota Twins ===
On August 9, 2018, the Athletics traded Chalmers to the Minnesota Twins in exchange for Fernando Rodney. He did not pitch after being traded. In 2019, he began the year rehabbing before being assigned to the Fort Myers Miracle, with whom he started five games, pitching to a 1–1 record with a 3.38 ERA.

On November 20, 2019, the Twins added Chalmers to their 40-man roster to protect him from the Rule 5 draft. Chalmers did not play in a game in 2020 due to the cancellation of the minor league season because of the COVID-19 pandemic. Chalmers was assigned to the Double-A Wichita Wind Surge, but struggled to a 9.49 ERA in 12 1/3 innings of work. On May 29, 2021, Chalmers was designated for assignment by the Twins.

=== Chicago Cubs ===
On June 5, 2021, Chalmers was claimed off waivers by the Chicago Cubs. On June 11, Chalmers was designated for assignment by the Cubs without appearing in a major or minor league game for the organization. He was outrighted to the Double-A Tennessee Smokies on June 13. Chalmers worked to a 5.37 ERA in 15 appearances (14 of them starts), and also appeared in one game for the Triple-A Iowa Cubs. He elected free agency following the season on November 7.

=== Los Angeles Dodgers ===
On March 16, 2022, Chalmers signed a minor league contract with the Los Angeles Dodgers. He allowed 13 runs in 13 innings in 13 games for the Triple-A Oklahoma City Dodgers before he was released by the organization on July 27.

=== Gastonia Honey Hunters ===
On August 19, 2022, Chalmers signed with the Gastonia Honey Hunters of the Atlantic League of Professional Baseball. In 11 games (7 starts) for Gastonia, he struggled to a 6.87 ERA with 51 strikeouts across 38 innings of work. Chalmers became a free agent following the season.

=== Arizona Diamondbacks ===
On January 20, 2024, Chalmers signed a minor league contract with the Arizona Diamondbacks. In 25 appearances for the Triple–A Reno Aces, he struggled to an 0–5 record and 9.57 ERA with 44 strikeouts across 26 1/3 innings pitched. On June 19, Chalmers was released by the Diamondbacks organization.

=== High Point Rockers ===
On July 2, 2024, Chalmers signed with the High Point Rockers of the Atlantic League of Professional Baseball. In 21 appearances for the Rockers, he logged a 3–3 record and a 4.00 ERA with 52 strikeouts and 6 saves across 27 innings of relief. Chalmers became a free agent following the season.

=== Rieleros de Aguascalientes ===
On February 9, 2025, Chalmers signed with the Rieleros de Aguascalientes of the Mexican League. In three appearances (two starts) for Aguascalientes, he struggled to an 0-2 record and 14.54 ERA with four strikeouts across 4 1/3 innings pitched. Chalmers was released by the Rieleros on May 5.

=== Conspiradores de Querétaro ===
On May 21, 2025, Chalmers signed with the Conspiradores de Querétaro of the Mexican League. In three appearances (one start) for Querétaro, he struggled to an 11.81 ERA with eight strikeouts across 5 1/3 innings pitched. Chalmers was released by the Conspiradores on June 1.

=== Charleston Dirty Birds ===
On June 11, 2025, Chalmers signed with the Charleston Dirty Birds of the Atlantic League of Professional Baseball. He made one start for the team, but did not record an out after allowing two runs and two walks with no strikeouts. Chalmers was released by Charleston on June 19.

=== Lake Country DockHounds ===
On June 24, 2025, Chalmers signed with the Lake Country DockHounds of the American Association of Professional Baseball. In one appearance for the DockHounds, Chalmers allowed three runs on one hit and four walks with one strikeout over one inning.

=== Cleburne Railroaders ===
On June 29, 2025, Chalmers was claimed off waivers by the Cleburne Railroaders of the American Association of Professional Baseball. In 12 appearances (10 starts) for the Railroaders, Chalmers compiled a 2-4 record and 4.19 ERA with 79 strikeouts across 62 1/3 innings pitched.

On January 14, 2026, Chalmers signed with the Saraperos de Saltillo of the Mexican League. However, he failed to make the Opening Day roster and was released prior to the start of the season on April 14.

=== Kansas City Monarchs ===
On April 17, 2026, Chalmers signed with the Kansas City Monarchs of the American Association of Professional Baseball. In five starts for the Monarchs, Chalmers posted a 0–2 record with a 7.97 ERA and 17 strikeouts across 20 1/3 innings pitched.

=== Cleburne Railroaders (second stint) ===
On June 11, 2026, Chalmers was traded to the Cleburne Railroaders of the American Association of Professional Baseball in exchange for a player to be named later. He was released on August 5.
