= Jason Isringhausen =

American baseball player (born 1972)

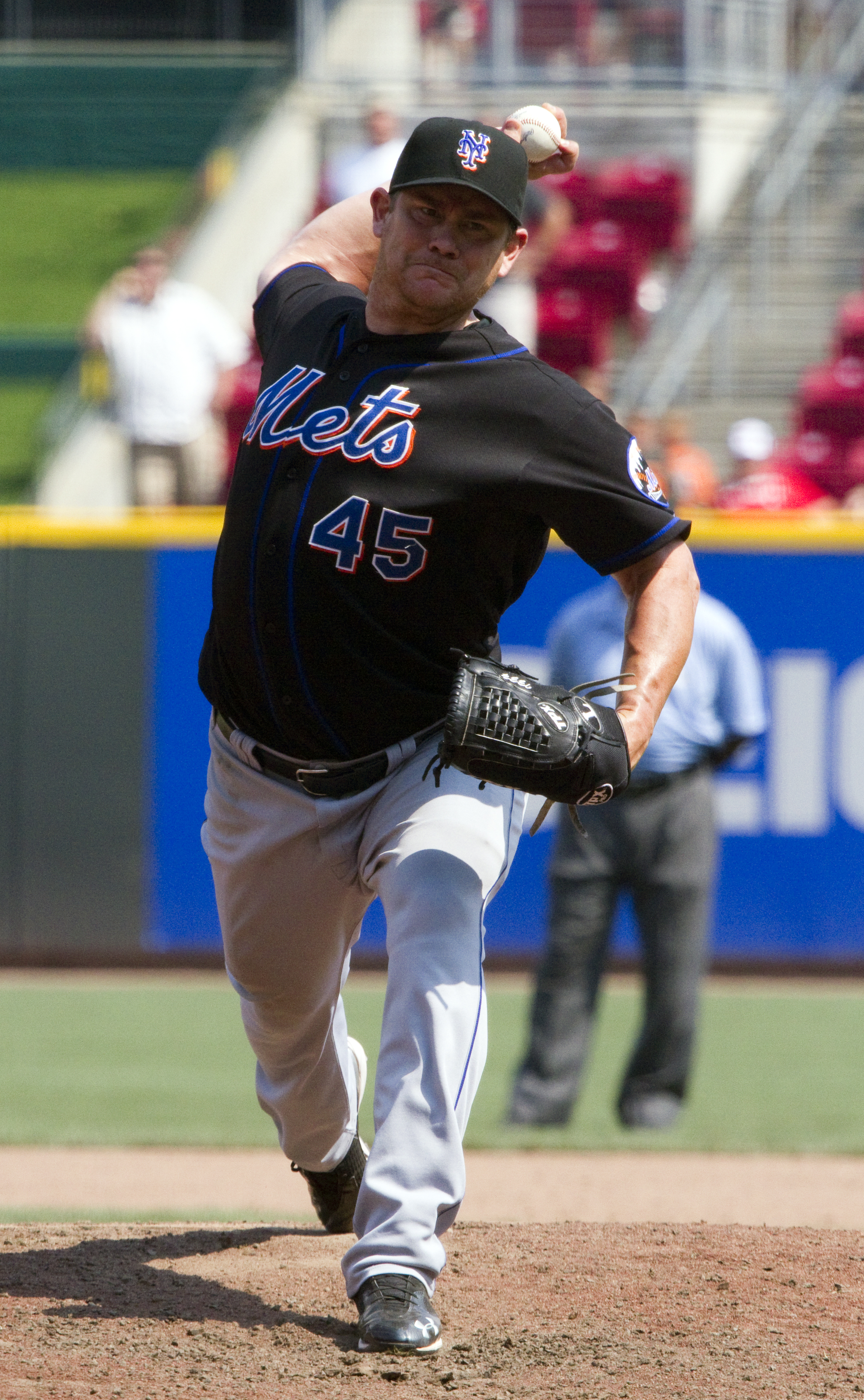
- Isringhausen with the Mets in 2011
- Pitcher
- Born: September 7, 1972 (age 53); Brighton, Illinois, U.S.
- Batted: Right Threw: Right

MLB debut
- July 17, 1995, for the New York Mets

Last MLB appearance
- September 19, 2012, for the Los Angeles Angels of Anaheim

MLB statistics
- Win–loss record: 51–55
- Earned run average: 3.64
- Strikeouts: 830
- Saves: 300
- Stats at Baseball Reference

Teams
- New York Mets (1995–1997, 1999); Oakland Athletics (1999–2001); St. Louis Cardinals (2002–2008); Tampa Bay Rays (2009); New York Mets (2011); Los Angeles Angels of Anaheim (2012)

Career highlights and awards
- 2× All-Star (2000, 2005); NL saves leader (2004); St. Louis Cardinals Hall of Fame

Jason Derik Isringhausen (/ˈɪzrɪŋhaʊzɪn/ born September 7, 1972) is an American former professional baseball pitcher. He played 16 seasons in Major League Baseball (MLB) for the New York Mets, Oakland Athletics, St. Louis Cardinals, Tampa Bay Rays, and Los Angeles Angels of Anaheim. Isringhausen was, with Bill Pulsipher and Paul Wilson, a member of "Generation K", a group of highly regarded Mets prospects. Isringhausen proceeded to have a successful career as a closer, recording exactly 300 career saves. He was a two-time All-Star and led the National League in saves in 2004.

== Early life ==
Isringhausen was born on September 7, 1972, in Brighton, Illinois, one of at least three children of Charles and Georgene Isringhausen. Isringhausen played catcher at Southwestern High School before being moved to the outfield at Lewis and Clark Community College.

== Playing career ==
=== New York Mets (1992–1999) ===
Isringhausen was chosen as a draft-and-follow prospect by the New York Mets in the 44th round of the 1991 Major League Baseball draft. He signed in May 1992.

In the mid-1990s, Isringhausen and fellow minor-league pitchers Bill Pulsipher and Paul Wilson—collectively dubbed "Generation K"—were widely hyped as the next New York Mets superstars. But injuries took their toll and 1995 was the first year that all three started the season healthy.

Isringhausen began his career as a starter for the Mets near the end of the 1995 season, posting a 9–2 record in 14 starts. But a steady progression of serious injuries, including tuberculosis, a broken wrist (sustained while punching a dugout trash can), and three major operations on his pitching arm, derailed his progression into the major-league rotation. (He also was caught clandestinely playing softball for a strip club while rehabilitating.) He missed most of the 1997 season and the entire 1998 season. When he was finally healthy in 1999, he was moved to the bullpen after only five starts. Still, Mets manager Bobby Valentine was reluctant to use Isringhausen in relief, saying that it would be akin to "[using] an Indy car as a taxi." After inconsistent play with the Mets, he was traded to the Oakland Athletics at the trading deadline for reliever Billy Taylor.

=== Oakland Athletics (1999–2001) ===
As a relief pitcher and closer for the Athletics, Isringhausen's performance improved. Isringhausen established himself as a top closer with Oakland, as the A's made the playoffs in 2000 and 2001. Isringhausen earned his first selection to the All-Star game in 2000.

=== St. Louis Cardinals (2002–2008) ===
Isringhausen signed with the Cardinals as a free agent before the 2002 season. During Isringhausen's time with the team, the Cardinals won the Central Division in 2002, 2004, 2005, and 2006 with World Series appearances in 2004 and 2006, winning the World Series in 2006. He registered a league-leading 47 saves in 2004, tying Lee Smith's franchise record (broken in 2015 by Trevor Rosenthal). He was an All-Star and posted a 2.14 earned run average (ERA) with 39 saves in 2005 as the Cardinals won 100 games. The saves total was fifth in the NL.

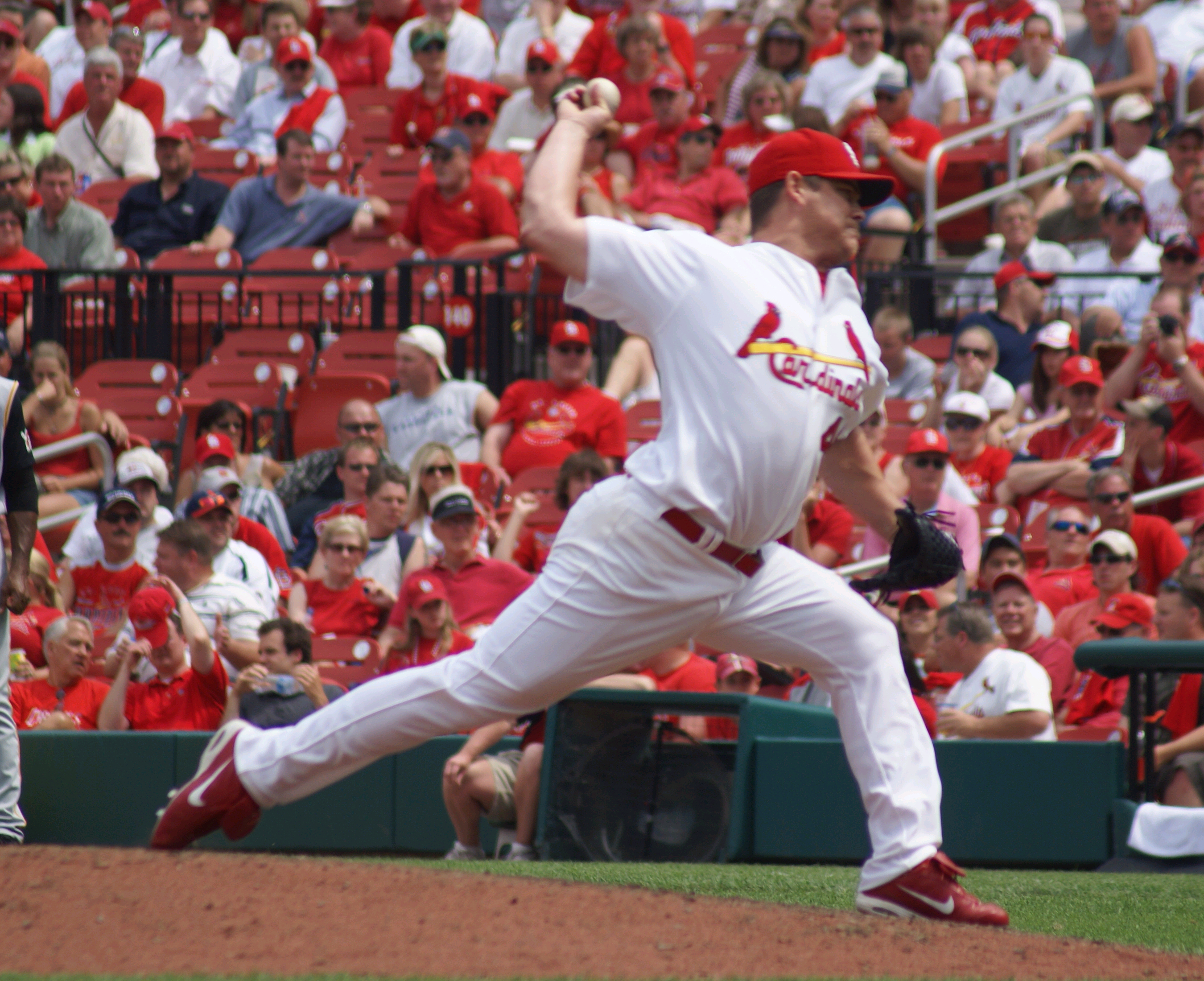
Isringhausen pitching for the St. Louis Cardinals in 2007.

Despite this success, Isringhausen's 2006 season began with two losses and a blown save in his first five appearances. He struggled with control problems throughout the season, leading to 38 walks (the most given up by Isringhausen in a season since he became a closer) and a 3.55 ERA, which was his highest ERA as a closer since the 2000 season, in which his ERA was 3.78. Isringhausen finished the season with a 4–8 record and 33 saves along with 10 blown saves. He missed the entire 2006 playoffs due to a hip injury, allowing rookie Adam Wainwright to become the Cardinals' closer for the playoffs and that team's World Series Championship.

During the 2006 off-season, Isringhausen underwent his second hip surgery in two years. With Wainwright slotted into the rotation, Isringhausen was returned to the closer role to begin 2007. Isringhausen responded by notching career numbers in 2007, posting a 4–0 record, 2.48 ERA, and 32 saves while walking 28, striking out 54, and giving up only four home runs in 63 1/3 innings pitched, appearing in 63 games. Batters hit .179 against him.

On September 25, 2007, Isringhausen was named as one of 10 finalists for the "DHL Presents the Major League Baseball Delivery Man of the Year Award"; and on October 5, 2007, it was announced the St. Louis Cardinals had picked up Isringhausen's option for the 2008 season.

On May 10, 2008, manager Tony La Russa removed Isringhausen as the club's closer. On July 29, 2008, La Russa announced that Isringhausen had resumed his role as closer.

On August 19, 2008, Isringhausen left the team due to lingering elbow tendinitis and a torn tendon.

=== Tampa Bay Rays (2009) ===
On February 20, 2009, Isringhausen signed a minor league deal with the Tampa Bay Rays with an invitation to spring training. On April 1, 2009, Isringhausen was added to the 40-man roster of the Rays, and began the season on the disabled list. Once activated, Isringhausen pitched in nine games before it was announced on June 13 that he tore a ligament in the surgically repaired right elbow and would miss the rest of the season to undergo his third Tommy John surgery.

=== Cincinnati Reds (2010) ===
On July 20, 2010, Isringhausen pitched a bullpen session for the Cincinnati Reds. He impressed both pitching coach Bryan Price and former Cardinals and current Reds General Manager Walt Jocketty enough that the Reds prepared a contract offer for Isringhausen.

On July 22, 2010, Isringhausen agreed to terms with a minor league contract with the Cincinnati Reds.

=== Return to the Mets (2011) ===
Isringhausen signed a minor league contract with an invitation to spring training for the 2011 season. He began the season in extended spring training, but was promoted to the Mets on April 10. He had a good outing in his first game, against the Colorado Rockies. He was called in with one out in the bottom of the eighth inning and retired both batters he faced. His return also made him the only pitcher in major league history to return to the mound after a third Tommy John operation. He was being used as the 8th-inning setup pitcher for the Mets until closer Francisco Rodriguez was traded to the Milwaukee Brewers. Isringhausen was then moved to the closer's role. On July 19, 2011, he picked up his first save since 2008. On August 15, 2011, Isringhausen became the 23rd pitcher to notch 300 career saves, which he did against the San Diego Padres in a 5–4 Mets win.

=== Los Angeles Angels of Anaheim (2012) ===
On February 22, 2012, he signed a minor league contract with the Los Angeles Angels of Anaheim. He eventually appeared in 50 games out of the bullpen for the Angels with a 4.14 ERA.

== Coaching career ==
On February 14, 2013, Isringhausen was named volunteer pitching coach at Southern Illinois University Edwardsville (SIUE) in Edwardsville, Illinois, where he resides during the offseason. While a member of the staff at SIUE, Isringhausen denied through his agent that he was retiring from Major League Baseball, and was still looking for pitching jobs.

== See also ==
- List of Major League Baseball annual saves leaders
- List of Major League Baseball pitchers who have thrown an immaculate inning
- List of St. Louis Cardinals team records
