= Fernando Rodney =

Dominican baseball player (born 1977)

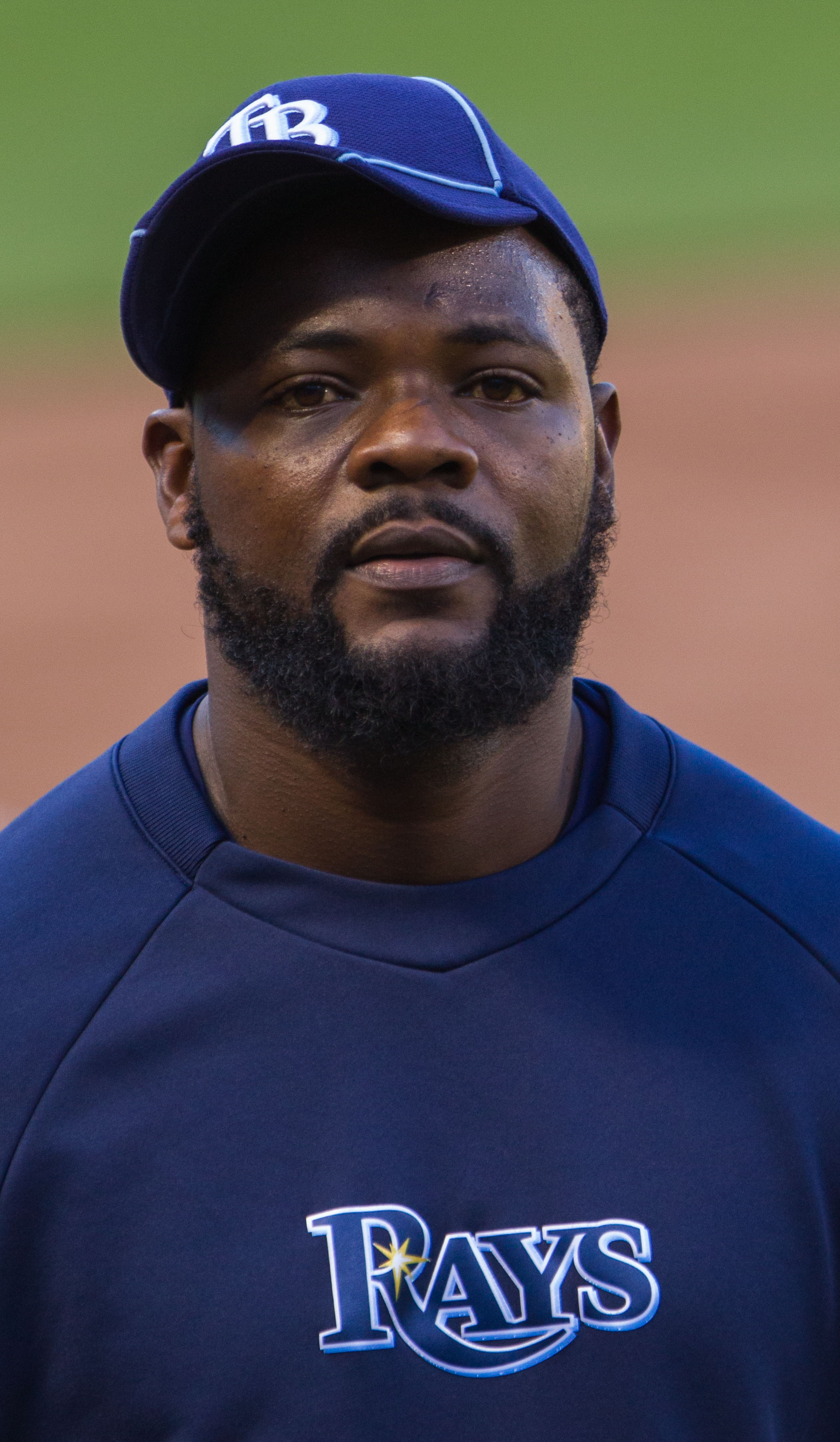
- Rodney with the Tampa Bay Rays in 2012

Free agent
- Pitcher
- Born: March 18, 1977 (age 49); Samaná, Dominican Republic
- Batted: Right Threw: Right

MLB debut
- May 4, 2002, for the Detroit Tigers

Last MLB appearance
- September 28, 2019, for the Washington Nationals

MLB statistics
- Win–loss record: 48–71
- Earned run average: 3.80
- Strikeouts: 943
- Saves: 327
- Stats at Baseball Reference

Teams
- Detroit Tigers (2002–2003, 2005–2009); Los Angeles Angels of Anaheim (2010–2011); Tampa Bay Rays (2012–2013); Seattle Mariners (2014–2015); Chicago Cubs (2015); San Diego Padres (2016); Miami Marlins (2016); Arizona Diamondbacks (2017); Minnesota Twins (2018); Oakland Athletics (2018–2019); Washington Nationals (2019)

Career highlights and awards
- MLB: 3× All-Star (2012, 2014, 2016); World Series champion (2019); Delivery Man of the Year (2012); AL Comeback Player of the Year (2012); Saves leader (2014); International: All-World Baseball Classic Team (2013)
Medals
Men's baseball
Representing Dominican Republic
World Baseball Classic
Gold medal – first place	2013 San Francisco	Team

Fernando Rodney (born March 18, 1977) is a Dominican-American professional baseball pitcher who is a free agent. He has previously played in Major League Baseball (MLB) for the Detroit Tigers, Los Angeles Angels of Anaheim, Tampa Bay Rays, Seattle Mariners, Chicago Cubs, San Diego Padres, Miami Marlins, Arizona Diamondbacks, Minnesota Twins, Oakland Athletics, and Washington Nationals.

Rodney made his debut in MLB in 2002 and joined the 300 save club in 2017. In 2019, following Ichiro Suzuki's retirement, Rodney became the oldest active MLB player and was the last player born in the 1970s to play in the majors. He won a World Series championship with the Nationals that year, his most recent season in MLB. He has subsequently pitched in the independent and minor leagues.

Rodney is a three-time MLB All-Star. He won the MLB Delivery Man of the Year Award and American League Comeback Player of the Year Award in 2012. He played for the Dominican Republic in three World Baseball Classic tournaments and holds the tournament record with eight career saves. He throws a 95 mph fastball and a palmball in the low 80s. He is known for celebrating by shooting a pretend bow and arrow into the sky.

== Professional career ==
=== Detroit Tigers ===
==== Minor leagues ====
Rodney was signed by the Detroit Tigers as an amateur free agent in 1997. He spent 1999–2003 in the minor leagues, moving from the Gulf Coast League to the International League. He underwent Tommy John surgery following the 2003 season, which he spent in the minor leagues. He spent the 2004 season recovering and failed to make the Tigers' Opening Day roster after 2005 spring training.

==== Major leagues ====
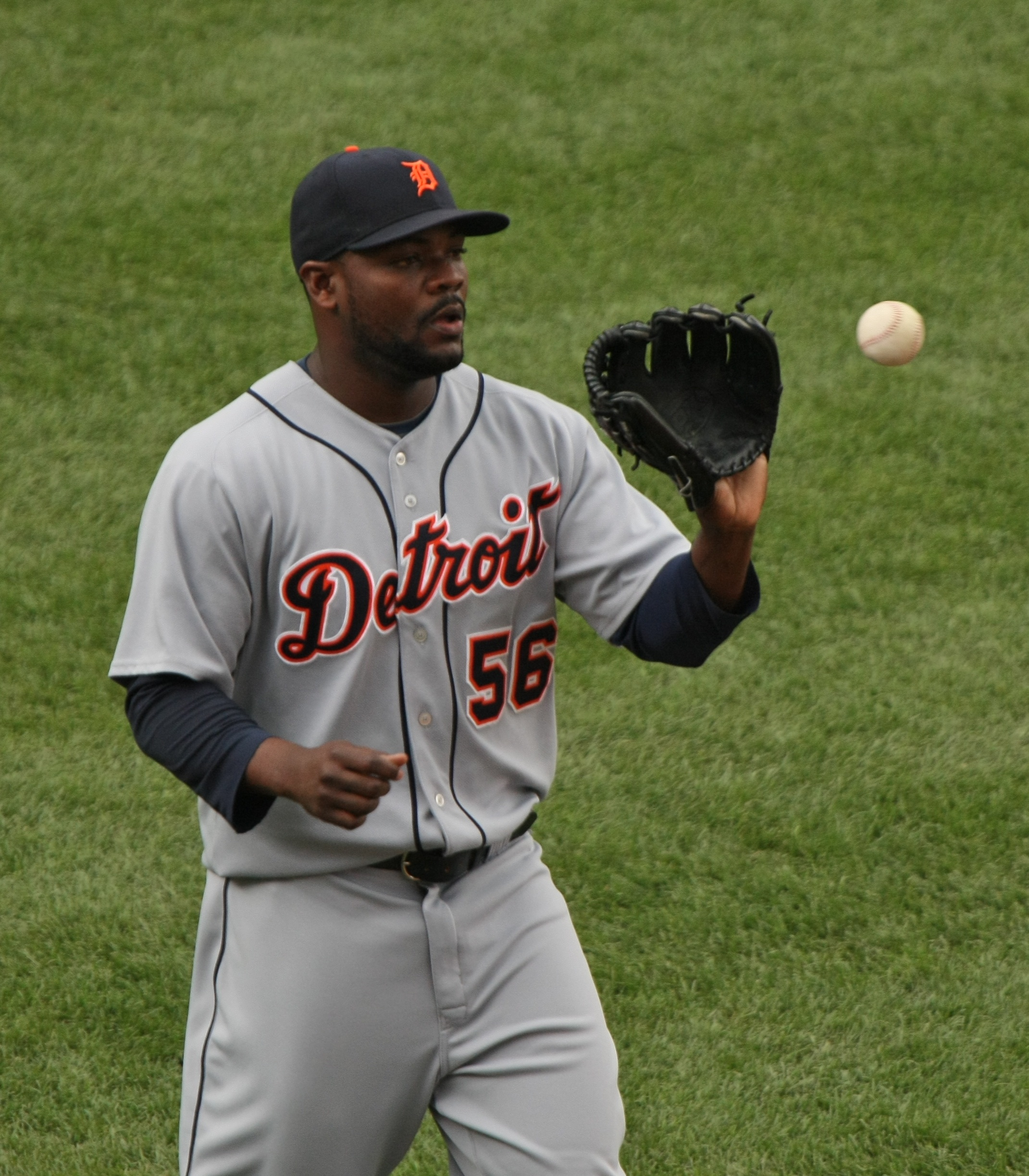
Rodney playing for the Detroit Tigers in 2009

Rodney made his major league debut in 2002 at the age of 25 and split his time between the Triple-A Toledo Mud Hens and the Tigers from 2002 to 2005.

In 2005, Rodney became the Tigers closer after Troy Percival went down with an arm injury and his replacement, Kyle Farnsworth, was traded at mid-season to the Atlanta Braves. He was called up from Toledo after Farnsworth was traded, then settled into the closer role, earning nine saves in 39 total appearances, during which he racked up a 2.86 earned run average.

When the Tigers signed closer Todd Jones before during the 2006 season, Rodney was reinserted into a middle relief/setup role. He embraced the role as the Tigers proceeded to have a successful season. On July 3, at McAfee Coliseum in Oakland, California, Justin Verlander, Joel Zumaya, and Rodney each threw multiple fastballs clocked in at over 100 mph, becoming the first time in MLB history that three pitchers on the same team had done so during one game. Rodney was part of the World Series roster, hid first World Series appearance. The Tigers would end up losing the series to the St. Louis Cardinals.

Rodney started 2008 on the disabled list with shoulder tendinitis. He re-joined the big league club in mid-June. On July 27, Rodney was announced as the Tigers' closer, replacing Jones. Rodney was not particularly successful as a closer in 2008, saving only 13 games in 19 opportunities (68%) and pitching to a 4.91 ERA. He was much more reliable in 2009, converting 37 of his 38 save opportunities (97%). He also led the American League (AL) with 65 games finished in 2009.

Following the 2009 season, Rodney became a free agent. The Tigers offered arbitration to Rodney, which he rejected to pursue a multi-year deal. He was expected to be one of the more valuable closers on the market because as a "Type B" free agent, he would only cost teams a supplementary draft pick. His 1.40 ground ball/fly ball ratio was the highest among free-agent closers. The Baltimore Orioles and Philadelphia Phillies were rumored to be interested in signing Rodney. The Los Angeles Angels of Anaheim were also reported to be in serious discussions with his agent.

=== Los Angeles Angels of Anaheim ===
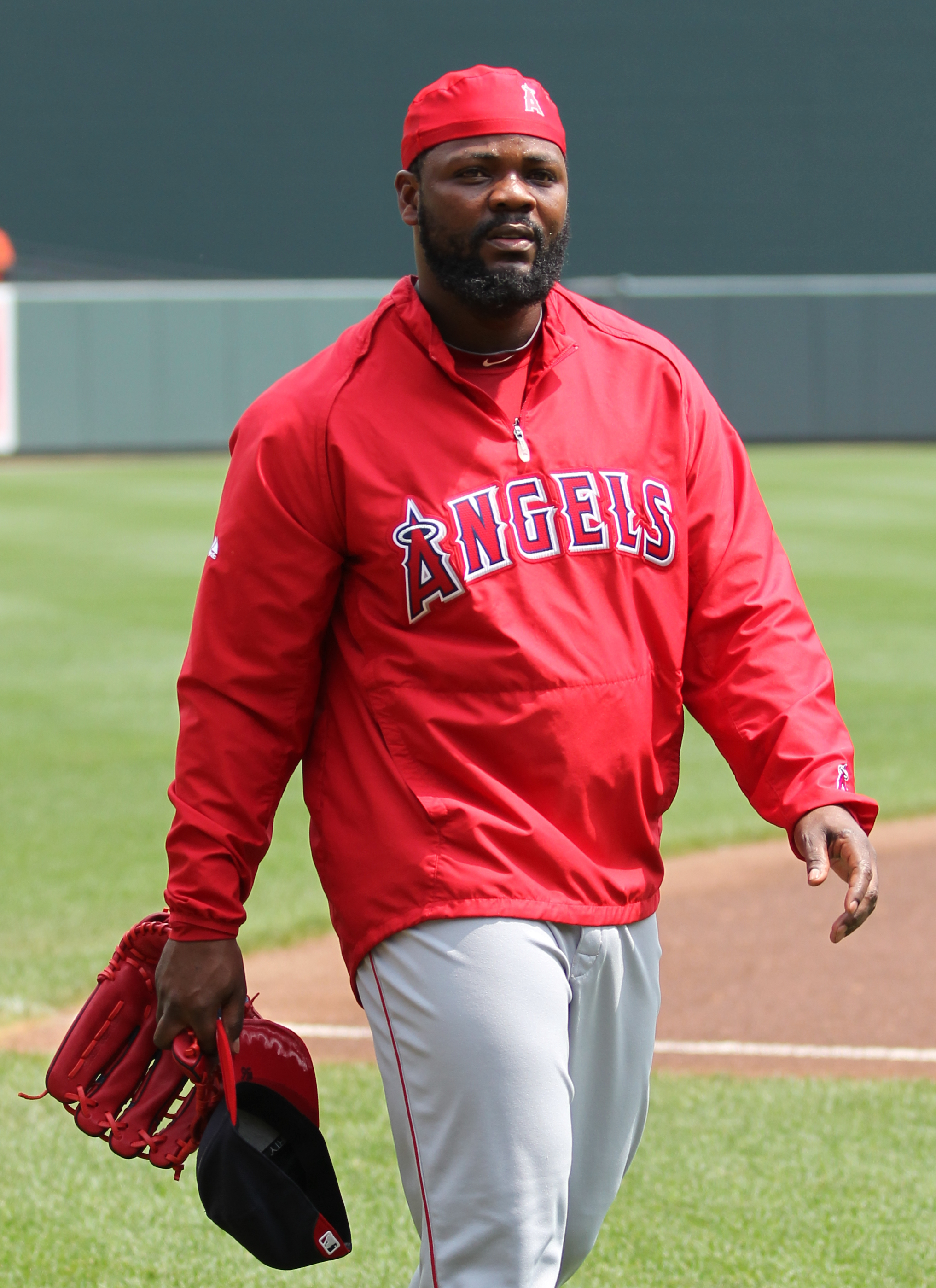
Rodney with the Los Angeles Angels of Anaheim in 2011

On December 24, 2009, Rodney signed a two-year, $11 million contract with the Los Angeles Angels of Anaheim. Although he closed for the Tigers in 2009, "Rodney is expected to share setup duties with Scot Shields and Kevin Jepsen and close on a fill-in basis when Brian Fuentes is down", the Los Angeles Times reported. Rodney stated, "I think I'm a different pitcher in save situations", referring to his lower ERA in save situations. In April 2010, he filled for Angels' closer Fuentes, who went on the disabled list with a strained back. Three days after the Angels traded Fuentes to the Minnesota Twins on August 27, manager Mike Scioscia announced that Rodney would be the team's closer.

On April 5, 2011, Jordan Walden replaced Rodney as the full-time closer. Toward the end of the 2011 season, Rodney became frustrated after a lack of relief appearances and asked Angels general manager Tony Reagins for a trade.

=== Tampa Bay Rays ===
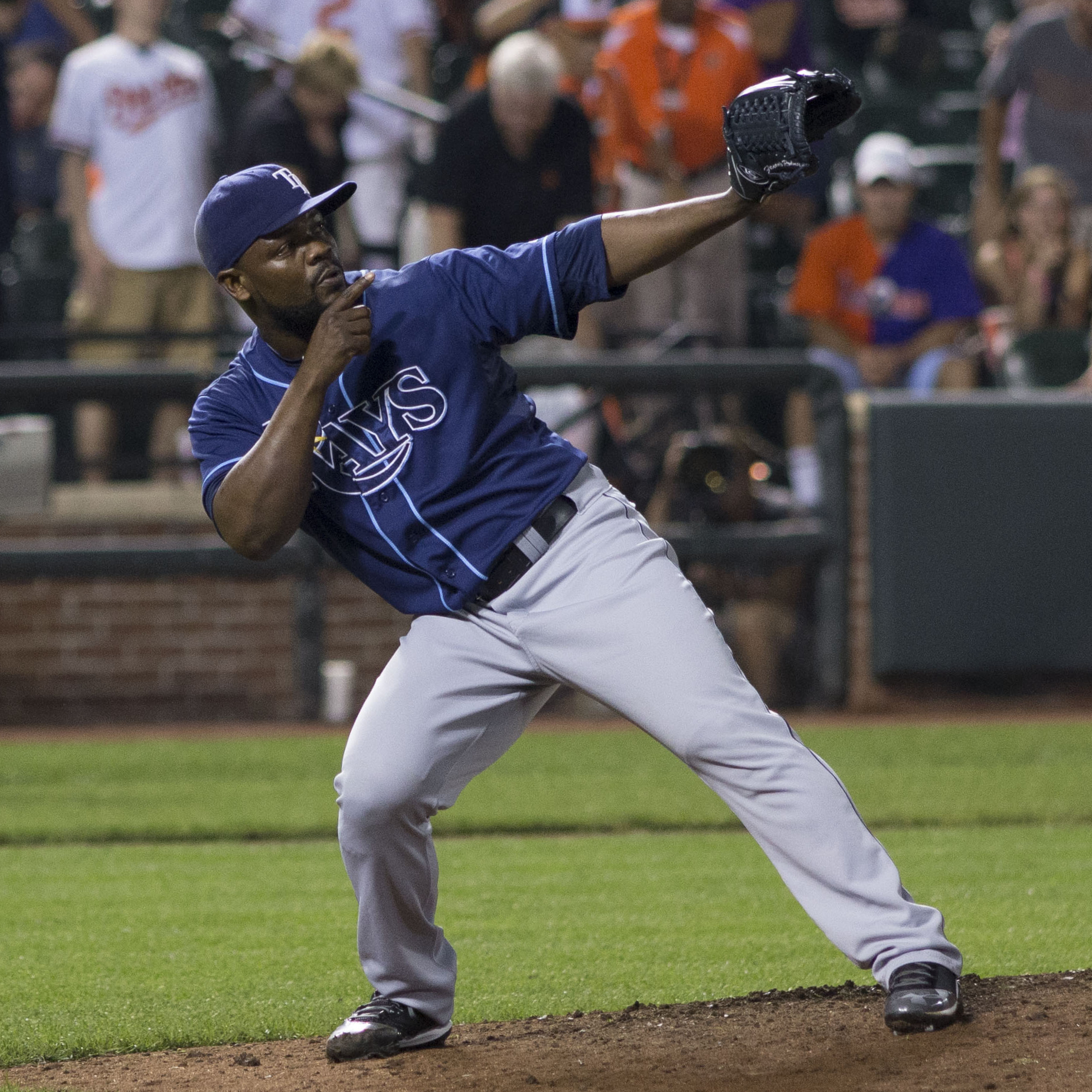
Rodney's bow and arrow pose in 2013, with the Tampa Bay Rays

Rodney signed a $1.75 million contract with the Tampa Bay Rays for the 2012 season. While Kyle Farnsworth was on the 60-day disabled list, Rodney assumed in the closer role, which he held after Farnsworth returned from his injury. Rodney was selected on July 6 to participate in his first All-Star Game. At that point in the season, he had converted 24 of 25 save opportunities. At the end of the season, Rodney had 48 saves, second-most behind Jim Johnson of the Baltimore Orioles. His 0.60 earned run average for the season was the lowest by a qualifying relief pitcher in major league history (later surpassed by Zack Britton in 2016). On October 19, Rodney was named the AL Comeback Player of the Year and the Delivery Man of the Year. During his time with the Rays, Rodney mimed shooting an arrow to high center field after converting a save as his celebration move.

=== Seattle Mariners ===
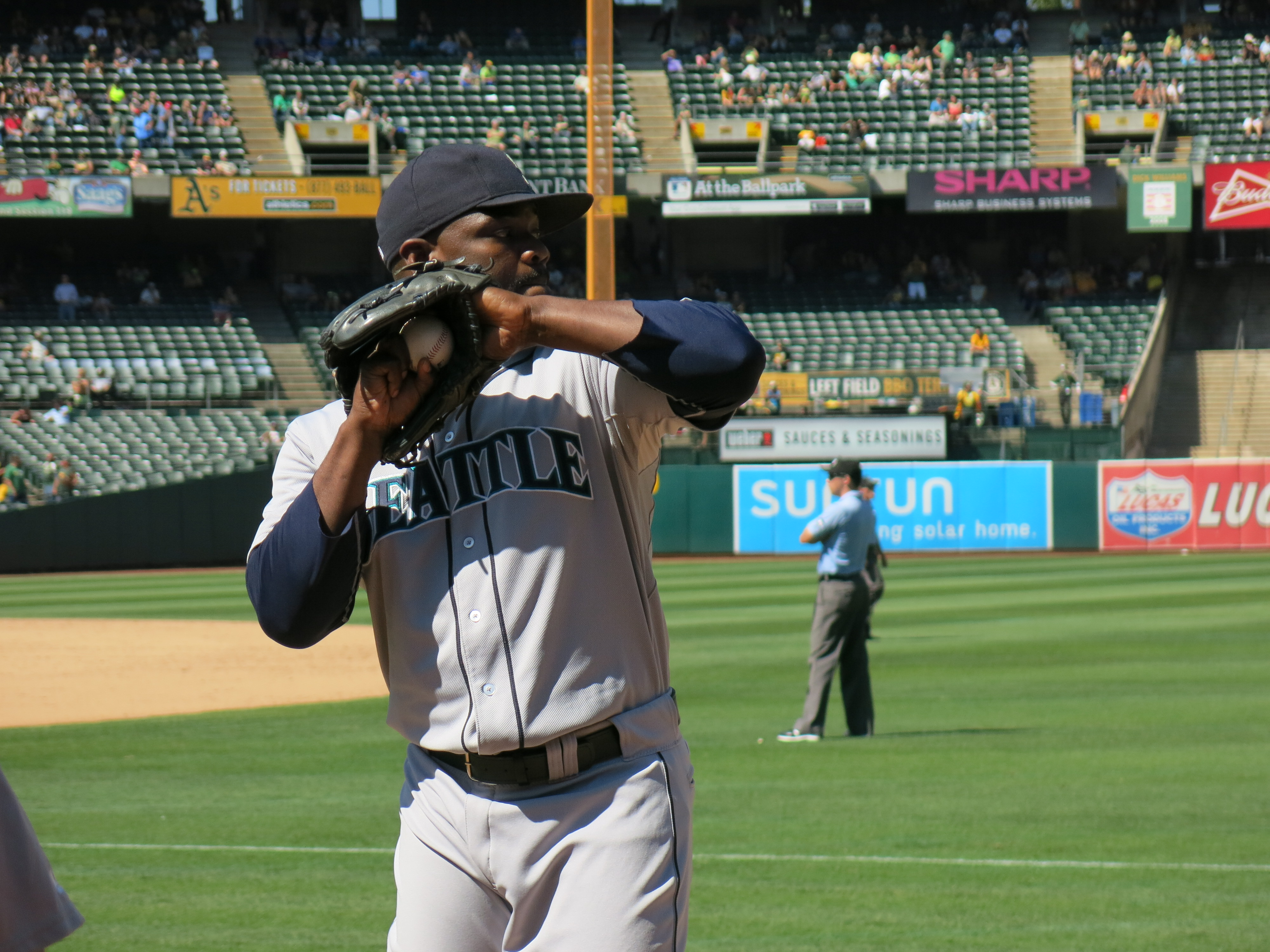
Rodney warming up for the Seattle Mariners in 2014

On February 6, 2014, Rodney signed a two-year, $14 million contract with the Seattle Mariners. After leading the AL in saves in the first half of the season, Rodney was a late addition to the All-Star team, taking the spot of David Price (who had pitched the Sunday before the game and thus could not pitch in the game). Rodney finished the 2014 season with an MLB-best 48 saves, which also topped Kazuhiro Sasaki's 45 saves for a new Mariners franchise record.

Rodney did not continue his success into 2015, carrying a 5–5 record with 16 saves in 22 opportunities and a 5.68 ERA before the Mariners designated him for assignment on August 22.

=== Chicago Cubs ===
Seattle traded Rodney to the Chicago Cubs for cash on August 27, 2015. He wore jersey #57, the first time in his career in which he wore a number other than 56. His Cubs debut came on August 28 at Dodger Stadium, where he already blew a save during the season. He pitched a scoreless eighth inning despite hitting a batter and throwing a wild pitch. With the Cubs in 2015, Rodney allowed one earned run in 12 innings.

=== San Diego Padres ===
On February 4, 2016, Rodney signed a one-year, $2 million contract with the San Diego Padres. On April 11, Rodney pitched a scoreless ninth inning to record his first save as a Padre in a win over the Philadelphia Phillies.

=== Miami Marlins ===
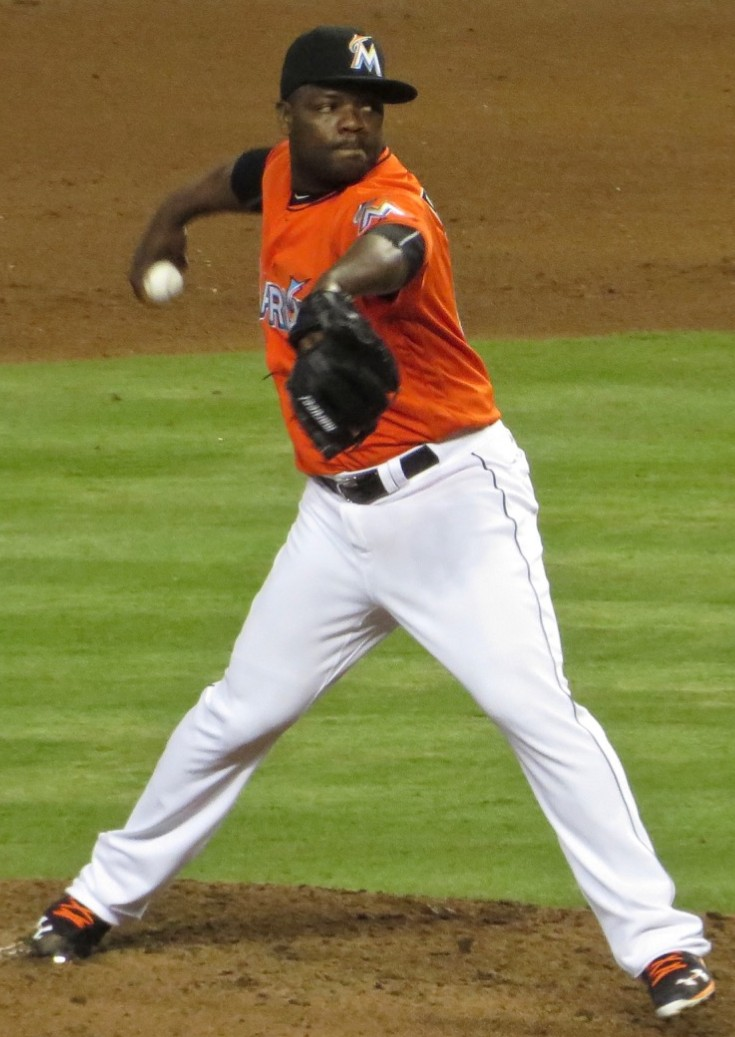
Rodney pitching for the Miami Marlins in 2016

On June 30, 2016, Rodney was traded to the Miami Marlins for Chris Paddack. He was 2–3 with Miami and pitched to a 5.89 ERA.

=== Arizona Diamondbacks ===
On December 9, 2016, Rodney signed a one-year, $2.75 million contract with the Arizona Diamondbacks. Rodney recorded his first win for the Diamondbacks on opening day and his first save in his next appearance on April 5, 2017. On June 7, Rodney became the 42nd pitcher all-time to finish 500 career games. On September 22, Rodney became the 28th pitcher all-time to record 300 career saves in a victory over the Miami Marlins.

=== Minnesota Twins ===
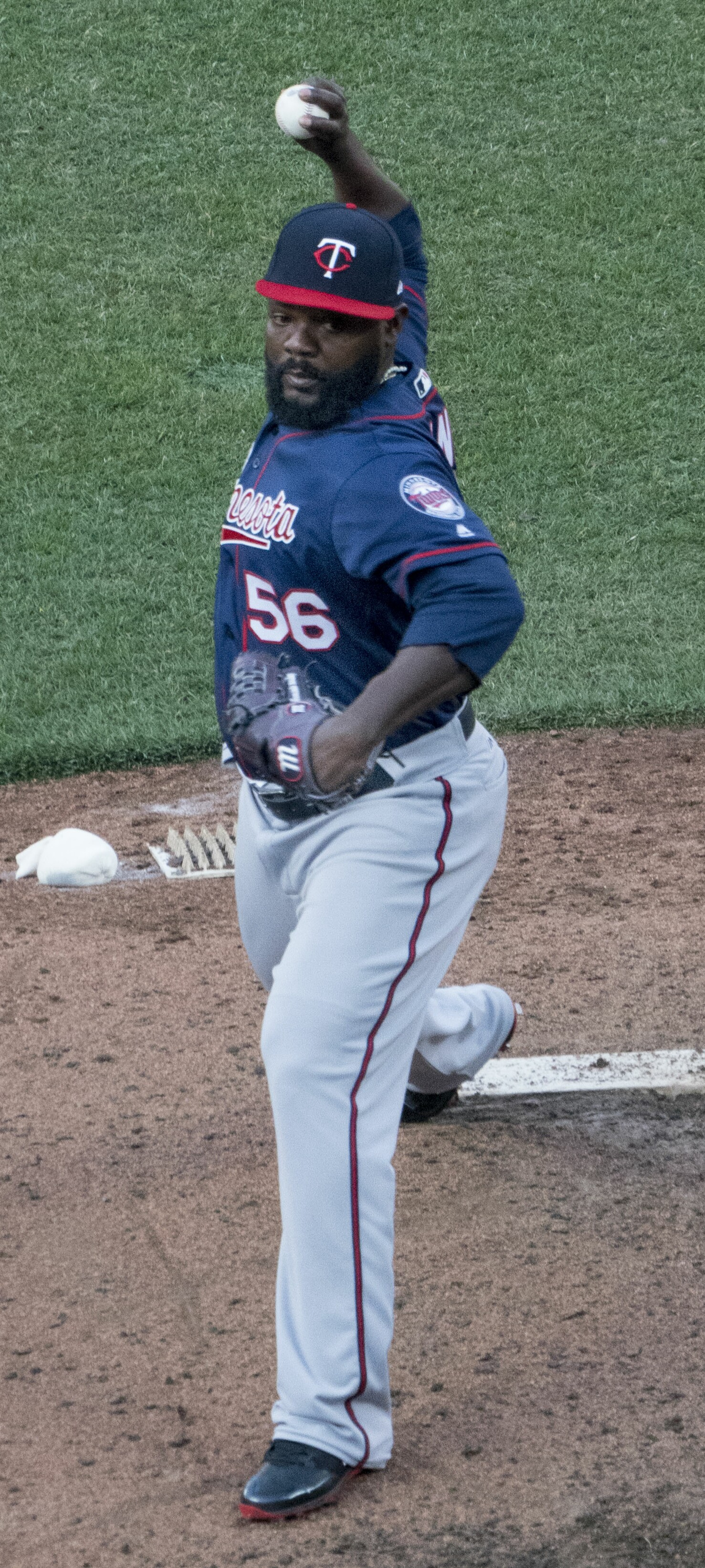
Rodney pitching for the Minnesota Twins in 2018

On December 15, 2017, Rodney signed a one-year, $4.5 million contract with the Minnesota Twins that included incentives that could increase the amount to $6 million, as well as a 2019 team option.

=== Oakland Athletics ===
On August 9, 2018, the Twins traded Rodney to the Oakland Athletics in exchange for minor league pitcher Dakota Chalmers. In 22 games for the A's, Rodney served as a setup man. He pitched to a 3.92 ERA in 20 2/3 innings. In 2018, he was the third-oldest player in the AL.

On May 25, 2019, Rodney was designated for assignment by Oakland. The A's released Rodney three days later. He had a 9.42 ERA in 17 appearances.

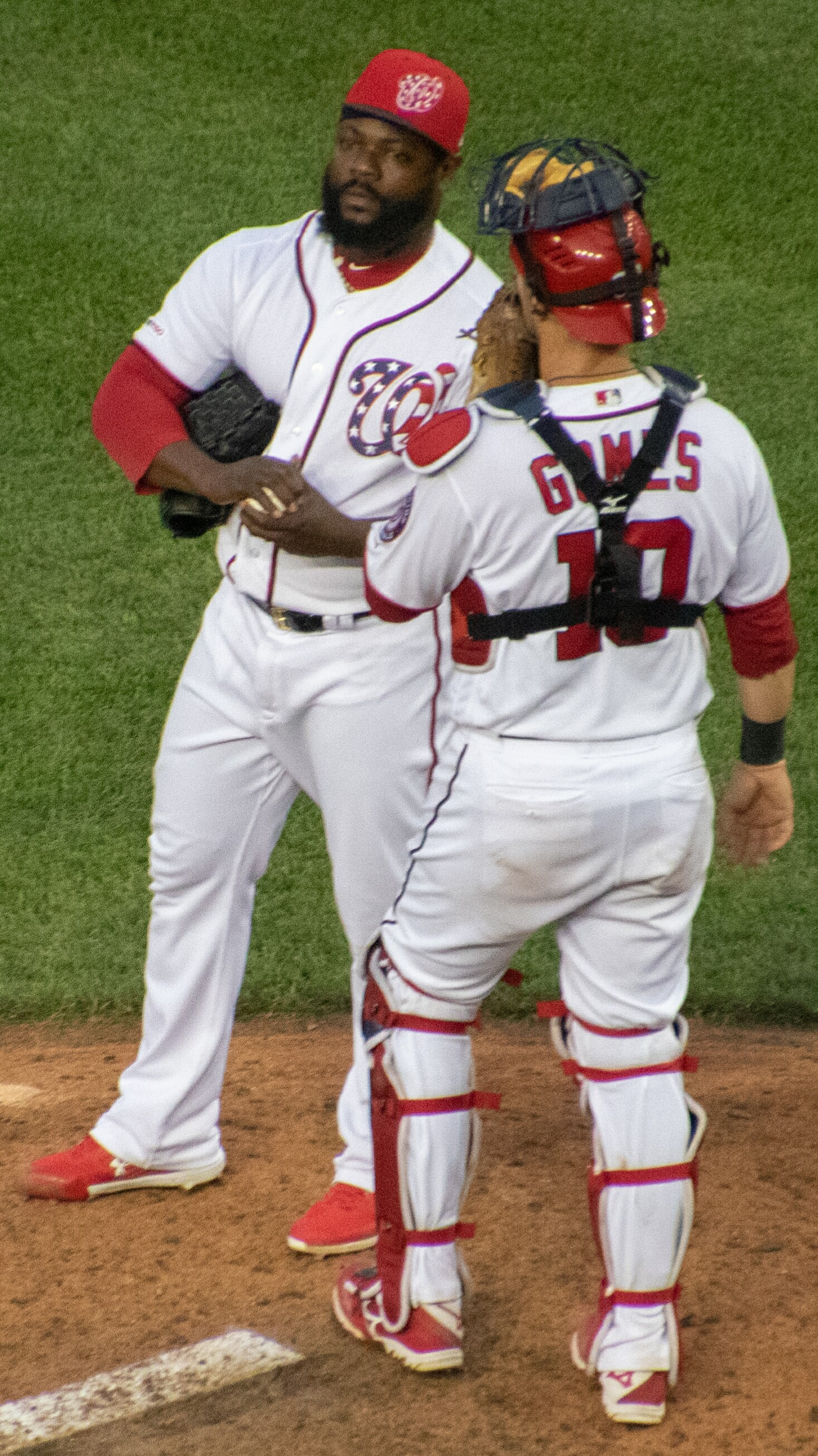
Rodney (left) with Yan Gomes in 2019

=== Washington Nationals ===
On June 1, 2019, Rodney signed a minor league contract with the Washington Nationals. On June 25, he was called up to the major leagues.

His combined regular season record in 2019 was 0–5 with two saves and a 5.66 ERA in 47 2/3 innings. He was the second-oldest player in the major leagues, behind Ichiro Suzuki. Rodney became the fourth player to appear in all rounds of the postseason (Wild Card, Division Series, Champion Series, and World Series) in both the AL and National League. He had six postseason appearances, three of which came in the World Series. The Nationals won, giving him his first championship at the age of 42.

=== Sugar Land Skeeters ===
On July 18, 2020, Rodney signed on to play for the Sugar Land Skeeters of the Constellation Energy League, a makeshift four-team independent league created as a result of the COVID-19 pandemic, for the 2020 season.

=== Houston Astros ===
On July 31, 2020, the Houston Astros signed Rodney to a minor league deal. Rodney was released by the Astros on September 2 after training at the team's alternate site.

=== Toros de Tijuana ===
On March 1, 2021, Rodney signed with the Toros de Tijuana of the Mexican Baseball League. He led the league with 16 saves, won the "Reliever of the Year" award, and saved 9 games in the playoffs to help the Toros win their second championship. Rodney returned to the Toros in 2022, and posted a 6–1 record with a 3.00 ERA and 22 saves in 39 innings pitched.

=== Diablos Rojos del México ===
On December 29, 2022, Rodney was traded to the Guerreros de Oaxaca for pitcher Francis Martes and subsequently loaned to the Diablos Rojos del México for the 2023 season. He made 6 appearances, posting a 2–1 record with a 6.35 ERA over 5 2/3 innings. Rodney was released on May 7.

=== Leones de Yucatán ===
On May 12, 2023, Rodney signed with the Leones de Yucatán. In 18 appearances, he had a 6.16 ERA with 6 saves over 19 innings pitched. He was waived on July 3.

=== Hamilton Cardinals ===
On November 28, 2024, Rodney signed with the Hamilton Cardinals of the semi-professional Intercounty Baseball League. He signed after the Canadian team's owner visited him in the Dominican Republic and said the team could only pay him in lodging and meals. Rodney said his goal is to keep pitching until he is 50 years old. He went 1–3 with 7 saves and a 3.37 ERA in 20 games and played in the league's All-Star Game. He was formally released on March 12, 2026.

== International career ==
Rodney played for the Dominican Republic national team in the 2006, 2013, and 2017 World Baseball Classic (WBC). He was named to the 2013 All-WBC team, going 7-for-7 in saves opportunities. His 8 saves are the most in WBC history.

== Pitching style ==
Rodney has primarily been a fastball-changeup pitcher. He throws both a two-seam sinking fastball averaging 95–96 MPH, and a four-seam fastball averaging 96–97 MPH. His fastball has been thrown as high as 101.5 MPH in 2013. By 2025, his fastball was 92–93 MPH. His main offspeed pitch is a palmball-style changeup at about 84 MPH. Opponents have hit the changeup at just a .179 clip over Rodney's career.

== Persona ==
=== Cap tilt ===
Rodney is known for wearing his cap tilted at an angle toward the left side of his head. He said in 2016 that it came about as a tribute to his father, Ulise, who was a fisherman. Ulise also wore his cap tilted to the side because that was the side the sun hit his face. Rodney also said the tilted cap could be confusing for both hitters and baserunners. "The hitter looks for your eyes. It's like a dog. When you go somewhere, the first thing (a dog) looks at is your eyes and how you move."

=== Bow and arrow celebration ===
Rodney is known for celebrating a save by pretending to shoot a bow and arrow toward the sky, usually at a point high over center field. He started the routine while with the Rays after saving a 1–0 ballgame on April 16, 2012, against their rival, the Boston Red Sox. It became his tradition after successfully saving each game that season and soon involved his Rays teammates. The infielders would approach the mound to watch Rodney shoot the arrow, and first baseman Carlos Peña would ask him where it had gone, with both theatrically pointing off into the distance as if following its flight.

In a July 20, 2014 game while pitching for the Mariners against his former team, the Angels, Rodney did the routine after making the third out to end the eighth inning. However, this time he mimicked shooting the arrow at the Angels dugout. In the ninth inning after walking Mike Trout on five pitches, Albert Pujols hit a double, scoring Trout, then mimicked shooting a bow and arrow from second base towards Trout. Trout then "shot an arrow" back at Pujols. The Angels went on to win 6–5 with a walk-off hit by Grant Green the same inning. Mariners broadcaster Dave Sims began calling "shoot that arrow in the sky!" when Rodney recorded a save.

== Personal life ==
On June 25, 2018, Rodney became a naturalized United States citizen. He was living in Pembroke Pines, Florida at the time.

Rodney's cousin is pitcher Alfredo Fígaro. Rodney has six children.

== See also ==
- List of Major League Baseball players from the Dominican Republic
