= Generation K (baseball) =

Baseball trio

Generation K were a baseball trio of young starting pitchers in the New York Mets organization in 1995, consisting of Bill Pulsipher, Jason Isringhausen, and Paul Wilson. Generation X was a hot topic in American media during the mid-1990s and the nickname came from the use of K to denote a strikeout in baseball scorekeeping. The trio were highly regarded and were expected to lead the club back to the top of the National League East standings for the first time since the end of the Dwight Gooden/Darryl Strawberry era. The prospect of their success drew comparisons to past Mets pitching stars such as Seaver/Koosman/Matlack and Gooden/Darling/Fernandez. All three players succumbed to pitching-related injuries within a year, and eventually only Isringhausen would have a productive major-league career, primarily as a closer for the Oakland Athletics and St. Louis Cardinals.

== Bill Pulsipher ==
Bill Pulsipher arrived first, in June 1995, after pitching over 200 minor league innings as a 21-year-old. Between the majors and the minors in 1995 he threw for 218 more innings for a 3.98 ERA. Pulsipher missed all of 1996 and most of 1997 with a torn elbow ligament. After a brief comeback bid in 2001 it appeared his career had ended. During this period Pulsipher compiled a 13–19 record and a 5.13 ERA, never having an ERA below 3.98 in any season. Yet another comeback came in 2004; after a solid year with the independent Atlantic League's Long Island Ducks, he was signed by the Seattle Mariners’ AAA affiliate Tacoma Rainiers. He pitched well there, but after a back injury led to his release he returned to the Ducks, leading them to an Atlantic League Championship victory.

In 2005, he received a non-roster invitation from the St. Louis Cardinals on Jason Isringhausen’s recommendation, and joined a race for Steve Kline’s lefty specialist job that already included several competitors, like the established Mike Myers and touted prospect Carmen Cali.

At first he was considered a long shot, but after pitching well in Spring Training, Myers was traded and Pulsipher became the second left-handed pitcher out of the bullpen. Two members of Generation K were on the same team for the first time since 1996. Unfortunately, injuries and the emergence of Randy Flores led to a brief major league showing for Pulsipher; he spent most of the year with the AAA Memphis Redbirds, and retired after the 2005 season.

== Jason Isringhausen ==
Isringhausen came next, in July 1995, and was the Mets’ best pitcher down the stretch with a 9–2 record and a 2.81 ERA. In 1996 he struggled with a pulled rib-cage muscle, bone spurs, and a torn labrum contributing to a 4.71 ERA. He had only six starts in 1997 and was ineffective before suffering a broken wrist. He missed all of 1998 recovering from reconstructive elbow surgery but was traded to the Oakland Athletics for reliever Billy Taylor in the middle of 1999.

Oakland made Isringhausen their closer. He posted a 2.13 ERA in his half-season with Oakland. His 96 mph fastball and knuckle-curve moved so much and broke so sharply that he sometimes had trouble keeping them out of the dirt. In his prime he was one of the games best closers and was elected to the All Star game twice, in 2000 with the Athletics and 2005 with the St. Louis Cardinals. With the St. Louis Cardinals, from 2002 to 2008, he pitched a minimum of 42 innings per season with a maximum era of 3.55, though he topped out in 2008 with a 5.70 ERA in 42.2 innings; he posted ERAs below 2.50 in each of his first two seasons with the club and led the National League with 47 saves in 2004.

Injuries eventually led to his release by the Cardinals after the 2008 season. He signed a minor league contract with the Tampa Bay Rays for the 2009 season. In earning his first decision of the 2009 season, Isringhausen topped off what was a catastrophic performance by the Tampa Bay Rays' bullpen. The Rays blew a 10–0 lead in Cleveland on May 25, 2009. Isringhausen faced 4 batters, gave up three straight walks and then the game-winning hit. Officially in the game, Izzy did not record an out. Gave up 1 hit, 3 walks, 0 strikeouts, 2 runs, both earned. He threw 23 pitches and only 9 were strikes - including the game-winning hit.

After missing the 2010 season (save for a brief stint in the Cincinnati Reds organization), in February 2011, Isringhausen returned to the Mets, signing a minor league deal with the team. After spending time in the minors, Isringhausen performed well in his return to the Majors with the Mets and eventually landed the job of setup man for Mets closer Francisco Rodriguez. After Rodriguez was traded to the Milwaukee Brewers in the middle of the season, Isringhausen was slotted into the closer role and eventually earned his 300th save against the San Diego Padres.

Isringhausen would then pitch the 2012 season with the Los Angeles Angels of Anaheim. Following the season, Isringhausen said that he is likely to retire, but has not formally done so. To date, his pitching line is 51–55 with a 3.64 ERA and 300 saves in 724 appearances.

== Paul Wilson ==
With the first pick in the 1994 first-year player draft the Mets selected what many thought as the most promising member of the trio, college phenom Paul Wilson. Featuring a strong fastball/slider combo he made the majors in early 1996 after strong minor league numbers. He had often been accused of possessing poor mechanics, and the stress put on his pitching arm haunted him early. After pitching 187 innings in the minors the year before, he spent much of 1996 on the disabled list. Wilson returned to the major leagues in 2000 with the Tampa Bay Devil Rays. He spent 2003–2005 with the Cincinnati Reds. After spending all of the 2006 season in the minor leagues, Paul Wilson retired with a career Major League record of 40–58 and a 4.86 career ERA.
