= Lakeview Academy =

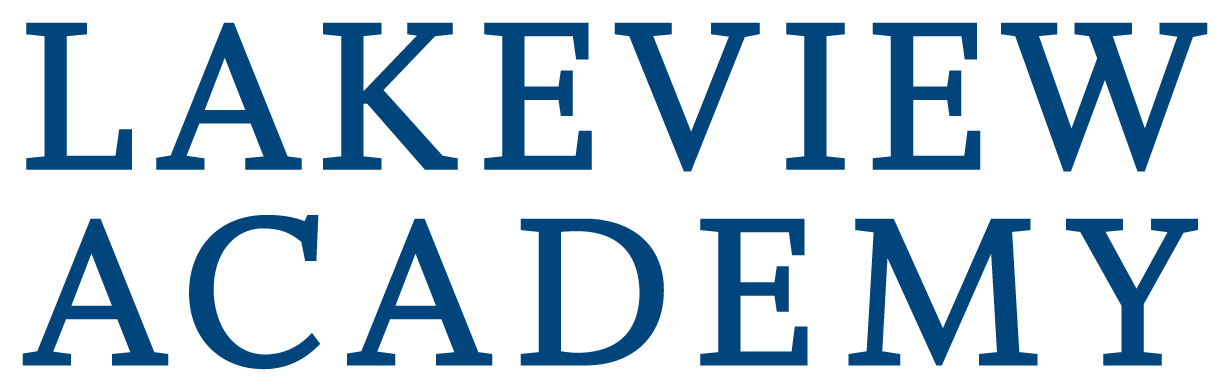

Location
- 796 Lakeview Drive; Gainesville, Hall County, Georgia; 34°19′16″N 83°48′23″W

Information
- Type: Private co-educational
- Motto: Veritas et Virtus (Truth and Virtue)
- Established: August 21, 1968 (Chartered); 1970 (Opened)
- Founder: Robert Tether
- NCES School ID: 00299733
- Head of School: John Simpson
- Assistant Head of School: Allen Tucker (Business); Wade Hanse (Education)
- Faculty: 63.8 (on an FTE basis)
- Grades: PreK-12
- Enrollment: 531 non pre-k
- Student to teacher ratio: 8.3
- Campus size: 92 acres
- Colors: Blue and orange
- Athletics conference: Georgia Independent School Association
- Mascot: Lion
- Accreditation: Southern Association of Independent Schools
- Affiliations: Independent
- Website: www.lakeviewacademy.org

Lakeview Academy is a coeducational, private, college-preparatory school day school in Gainesville, Georgia, United States, for Pre-K to twelfth grade students. It was established in 1970.

== Description ==
Lakeview has a preschool/kindergarten program, lower school (grades first through fifth), middle school (grades six through eight), and upper school (grades nine through twelve). A nonprofit, it is accredited by the Southern Association of Independent Schools and the National Association of Independent Schools.

Built on a little over 90-acre campus, Lakeview facilities include preschool, lower school, middle school, and upper school division buildings, athletic complexes, a fine arts annex and a common student center. The 17,000-square-foot, two-story middle school building opened in 2017. The school also constructed a $2.5 million football stadium and athletic facility in 2020. Construction on a new $6.6 million fine arts center began in June 2024 with plans to open for the 2025-26 school year.

=== Curriculum ===
Lakeview Academy offers college preparatory courses, including seventeen advanced placement courses and nine honors courses.

Fine arts courses include painting and drawing, sculpture and ceramics, photography, digital arts, theater, speech, drama, chorus, string orchestra, and band, as well as on-campus private music lessons.

Robotics classes are available in Singleton Hall.

=== Co-curricular activities ===
The school's robotics team competes in regional and statewide tournaments.

Lakeview Academy won the Georgia High School Association one-act play state title consecutively from 2013 to 2017. The title was subsequently lost in 2018, and brought back in 2021 with their production of Monty Python's Spamalot.

Lakeview Academy won the GHSA Region Literary Championship in 2017, placing first in six categories, and won the region championship 13 times from 2002–2017.

== History ==
From 1960 to 1970, public schools in Hall County were undergoing court ordered integration of public schools. In 1969, with the closure of Butler High School, Black students in Gainesville were integrated among the three remaining high schools.

Physician Robert Tether helped charter Gainesville Academy as a private college preparatory school on August 21, 1968, appealing to parents who "wanted to form a new school that could give their kids a chance to be accepted into the college of their choice", according to Tether's son Rusty. After a year of fund-raising, the Gainesville Academy opened on North Bradford Street in September 1969, with classes for sixth- and seventh-graders. In 1970, it was advertised as "open to all who meet the acceptance criteria and pass the entrance examination, regardless of race, creed, or color".

The academy was "initially providing Gainesville parents with an integration-free environment for their children", according to social historian Thomas Rasmussen. Author Winfred E. Pitts wrote, "Lakeview Academy, established in 1970 in response to desegregation, continues to grow as an almost exclusively white private school." Based on interviews of the former superintendent and assistant superintendent of Gainesville's public schools, Pitts wote that although they each emphasized they could not prove it, "both of the men believe the founding of Lakeview Academy was racially motivated; that is, to keep Whites and Blacks in segregated schools". (In January 2005, Lakeview advertised in Atlantic Magazine that its enrollment of 530 included 12% students of color. In the 2019–2020 school year the student population was 93.8% White, 2.4% Asian, 2% Hispanic, and 1.7% Black.)

Construction on "12 classrooms, a library and office" began in 1970 on Lakeview Drive. The first headmaster was Woodrow Light, who officiated on August 22, 1970, at the dedication of the school renamed Lakeview Academy. It had 87 students in first through ninth grades. Headmaster Light wrote, "We began the school year in September with eighty-seven students. The response from students, parents, trustees and friends has been so tremendous that our enrollment has steadily increased to ninety-six with additional applications pending." Enrollment at the end of that first school year surpassed 100 students.

Work on the upper school building was completed in 1973, and then work started on the gym. Enrollment at the end of the school year 1973–1974 was 219, and five students were the first graduates.

Ferrell Singleton served as head of the school from 1979 to 2005. He had a reputation for "building the school for more than two decades". He started the Lakeview Lions football program. Lakeview gives an annual Singleton award "for the student that best exemplifies Lakeview Academy". The middle school building was also named "Singleton Hall" in his honor. By 1999, the school served 450 students.

Jim Robison was head of school from 2005 to 2010. Robison established a tradition of an annual convocation ceremony, during which students in the upper school signed an honor code, "agreeing not to lie, cheat or steal, or approve of those who do". During Robison's time as head, the school completed a $1.5 million expansion of the cafeteria to accommodate 400 students, which was the first stage of a planned $7.5 million expansion to build 15 new classrooms to replace six modular classrooms.

From 2010 to 2019, John Kennedy served as head of school. He oversaw a $3 million capital fundraising campaign to develop a new middle school building. He strengthened the academy's fine arts program, Spanish and mathematics curriculum, and technology focus, especially in robotics. He also added a mentoring program, providing support for students with learning challenges.

Interim head of school John Simpson served for the 2019–2020 school year. He brought 14 years of service at Lakeview, including roles in admission and external relations, and as dean of students and coach.

Kristy Montgomery served as head from 2020 to 2022. Her leadership through the COVID pandemic "resulted in Lakeview staying open throughout 18 months of pandemic restrictions". A group of ten parents protested that "the school's board of trustees, the administration and its COVID-19 task force — which includes a local pediatrician, an emergency physician, and a registered school nurse — unanimously decided on Aug. 8 to mandate masks based on the surge in coronavirus cases in the area". When surveyed in 2020, "97% of parents reported being satisfied with the school's overall response to the coronavirus pandemic, with 75% rating the response as excellent".

John Simpson became Head of School in 2022. During his tenure, Lakeview Academy expanded its campus and academic programs. In 2024, the school announced the Keystone Program, a specialized academic program for students with dyslexia that launched in the 2025–26 school year. The program provides small-group, multisensory instruction in language arts and mathematics and began with an elementary school pilot before expanding to additional grade levels. In 2025, Lakeview Academy opened the $7 million Beverly Fine Arts Center, a 10,000-square-foot facility serving the school's kindergarten-through-12th-grade fine arts programs. Later that year, the school completed renovations to its Innovation and Technology Wing, expanding facilities for its robotics and esports programs.

== Athletics ==
Formerly a GHSA member, in 2022 Lakeview Academy changed to a Class AAA member of the Georgia Independent Athletic Association.

Lakeview Academy's Deuce Roark coached his 300th career coaching victory on March 4, 2025.

Lakeview Academy Varsity Girls Basketball wins second straight GIAA Class 3A State Championship Title in 2025. Lakeview's Varsity Boys Basketball team makes history with GIAA Class 3A State Championship title in 2024. Lakeview Varsity Girls Basketball also claimed the GIAA 3A State Championship Title in 2024, their first state title ever.

Basketball athlete Reno Earls was "a trailblazer, as one of the first black players at Lakeview Academy... one of the best in Hall County in the 1990s. He finished his career with the Lions in 1995 with a school-record 2,041 points." Earls died at age 44 in 2022, of complications due to COVID.

== Robotics and STEM ==
In 2024, Lakeview Academy was recognized by the nonprofit FIRST as one of 10 schools nationwide to receive its inaugural recognition for robotics education. The school offers robotics programs beginning in elementary school, and its varsity FIRST Tech Challenge team qualified for the world championship in 2023.

== Fine Arts ==
One Act Play Championships: GHSA - 2013, 2014, 2015, 2016, 2017, 2021, One Act Play Championships: GISA: 2024, 2025

Literary Champions: 2004, 2005, 2006, 2007, 2008, 2010, 2011, 2012, 2014, 2016, 2017, 2018, 2019, 2021, 2023, 2026

== Notable alumni ==
- Zac Brown, musician
- Ralston Cash, professional baseball player
- Dakota Chalmers, professional baseball player
- Matt Dubnik, member of Georgia House of Representatives
- Patrick Phillips, poet, professor, and translator
