= Bill Pulsipher =

American baseball player (born 1973)

- Pitcher
- Born: October 9, 1973 (age 53); Fort Benning, Georgia, U.S.
- Batted: Left Threw: Left

MLB debut
- June 17, 1995, for the New York Mets

Last MLB appearance
- May 7, 2005, for the St. Louis Cardinals

MLB statistics
- Win–loss record: 13–19
- Earned run average: 5.15
- Strikeouts: 202
- Stats at Baseball Reference

Teams
- New York Mets (1995, 1998); Milwaukee Brewers (1998–1999); New York Mets (2000); Boston Red Sox (2001); Chicago White Sox (2001); St. Louis Cardinals (2005)

William Thomas Pulsipher (born October 9, 1973) is an American former professional baseball player. Pulsipher, a left-handed pitcher, played in Major League Baseball for the New York Mets, Milwaukee Brewers, Boston Red Sox, Chicago White Sox and St. Louis Cardinals over six seasons from 1995 to 2005. Once considered a top prospect and a member of the Mets' heralded "Generation K", his career was derailed by injuries, including a torn ulnar collateral ligament requiring Tommy John surgery, major depression and anxiety.

== Early life ==
Pulsipher was a military brat who was born in Fort Benning, Georgia. His family frequently relocated, including to Germany, before settling in Clifton, Virginia. His parents divorced, and he lived with his father and stepmother. While a senior at Fairfax High School, Pulsipher was named the All-Metropolitan D.C. Player of the Year as a pitcher and center fielder. The team finished the season with a 17–4 record. He also excelled at basketball, but baseball was his main focus, and at age 17 he was offered a full scholarship to Old Dominion University. The day before he was to leave, he decided to forego college and sign with the New York Mets after being chosen in the second round of the 1991 Major League Baseball draft. Fairfax teammate Brian Buchanan also made it to the Major Leagues after being drafted out of the University of Virginia by the New York Yankees in the first round of the 1994 MLB draft.

== Minor league career ==
In the Mets' minor league system, Pulsipher posted a 2.84 earned run average (ERA) in 1992 and ERAs of 2.08 with the Capital City Bombers and 2.24 with the St. Lucie Mets, both in 1993. In 1994, Pulsipher was selected to be a AA-level Eastern League all-star. He led the Binghamton Mets to the playoffs, where he threw a no-hitter on September 12 and was named the New York Mets Minor League Player of the Year. At age 20, Pulsipher was considered one of the top prospects in baseball.

Pulsipher, along with fellow Mets minor league pitchers Jason Isringhausen and Paul Wilson, were dubbed "Generation K" by sportswriters and fans.

== Major leagues career ==
=== Early injuries ===
In 1995, Pulsipher began the season with the Triple-A Norfolk Tides and continued pitching well against minor league hitting, with an ERA of 3.14. He was called up to the majors and made his big-league debut on June 17, 1995. Pulsipher finished the season with a 5–7 record and 3.98 ERA before a sore elbow ended his season three weeks early.

Towards the end of spring training in 1996, Pulsipher was still experiencing elbow pain when an MRI showed torn ligaments; subsequent Tommy John surgery wiped out his entire season. In 1997, Pulsipher started the season with Norfolk, but walked 38 batters in only 27 2/3 innings. He was sent down to the A-level St. Lucie Mets, but continued walking nearly a batter per inning. Pulsipher later recounted that he was diagnosed with depression around that time. He was prescribed Prozac and his pitching improved, including a 1.42 ERA out of the bullpen at AA Binghamton.

After beginning 1998 in Norfolk, Pulsipher was called back up to the majors for the first time in 2 1/2 seasons. Although his control problems did not resurface, he pitched poorly for New York, mostly in relief. At the July 31 trading deadline, Pulsipher was traded to the Milwaukee Brewers for Mike Kinkade.

Pulsipher started for the Brewers for the rest of 1998, but needed back surgery after the season. He started 1999 in the majors, but was soon on the disabled list when back problems recurred. After spending the second half in the majors and finishing with a 5.98 ERA, the Brewers traded him back to the Mets for infielder Luis López.

=== Frequent moves and a medical scare ===
On February 23, 2000, Pulsipher's pregnant wife found him unconscious and barely breathing on their bathroom floor. Pulsipher was rushed to the hospital with paramedics assisting his breathing and doctors restoring his weak heartbeat. Pulsipher attributes the attack to a dietary supplement which contained ephedra. Three years later, Pulsipher was nearby when his Baltimore Orioles teammate Steve Bechler collapsed and died, also from ephedra. Ephedra was banned by the Food and Drug Administration in 2004.

Pulsipher pitched poorly for Norfolk and New York in 2000 before being traded to the Arizona Diamondbacks for Lenny Harris. He spent the rest of the season in the minors, mostly with the Triple-A Tucson Sidewinders. The Tampa Bay Devil Rays signed him for 2001, but sent him to the minors during spring training and released him soon after. He was signed by the Boston Red Sox, pitched well for the Triple-A Pawtucket Red Sox, and was brought up to the majors in late June. After pitching very well in relief for a month, Pulsipher was awful through August with an ERA near 10.00 and was placed on waivers. The Chicago White Sox claimed him off waivers but he rejected an assignment to the minors after posting a 7.88 ERA and became a free agent.

=== Brief career change and comeback attempts ===
The Texas Rangers signed Pulsipher before the 2002 season, but for the second consecutive season, he was released during spring training. He was signed by the New York Yankees soon after, but was released again after posting a 14.73 ERA and injuring his groin with the Triple-A Columbus Clippers. His third release in 14 months combined with being off his antidepressant medication caused Pulsipher to quit baseball. He returned to his home in Port St. Lucie, Florida, and for a time was being paid eight dollars per hour to be a groundskeeper for the St. Lucie Mets.

While tending to the minor league complex's field in Florida, Pulsipher continued to stay in shape. In December 2002, he was signed by the Baltimore Orioles. While with the AAA Ottawa Lynx in 2003, he again experienced bouts of depression and anxiety and was prescribed Paxil, which he says improved his life.

In 2004, Pulsipher did not pursue a major league contract and instead signed with the Long Island Ducks of the independent Atlantic League. For the first time since 2000, Pulsipher was starting games, and he pitched well enough to be named an Atlantic League All-Star. He led Long Island to its first league championship, winning the clinching game.

Pulsipher was signed by the Seattle Mariners in August 2004, but was injured after two decent minor league starts and released in September. He recovered to pitch well for Indios de Mayagüez in the Caribbean Series. He was signed to play for a Tijuana team in the Mexican League when his former teammate Jason Isringhausen convinced the St. Louis Cardinals to invite him to 2005 spring training. Pulsipher did not allow a run for the entire spring training, but he injured his hamstring and had his toe broken by a line drive before the season started. Regardless, he made the team out of spring training and pitched in the majors for the first time since 2001. The hamstring injury recurred in mid-April, landing him on the disabled list. He returned a few weeks later, but was sent to the minors after two games. He was mostly a starter in the minor leagues before being released in early September.

Pulsipher finished 2005 with the Long Island Ducks, which made the playoffs for the second consecutive season. He spent the entire 2006 season with the Ducks, which again made the postseason. Pulsipher was the losing pitcher in the season-ending game. Pulsipher also played for the Ducks in 2007.

Pulsipher played a few winters for Puerto Rico and the Caribbean league while continuing to play in the independent leagues as well as the Mexican League. He started the 2010 season the pitcher/pitching coach for the GBL's Yuma Scorpions. Pulsipher returned to playing midseason, rejoining the Atlantic League pitching for the Somerset Patriots and re-signed with the Patriots for the 2011 season.

== Other activities ==
Between professional seasons, Bill Pulsipher is a private pitching instructor at 365 Athletics in Bellport, New York.

== Personal life ==
Pulsipher has two sons: Liam Hayden and Leyton Hale. Both were intentionally given the initials "LHP" for "left-handed pitcher". Liam pitched for Center Moriches High School and now is on Stony Brook University's baseball team.
