= John Ralston =

John Ralston may refer to:

- John Ralston (actor) (born 1964), Canadian actor
- John Ralston (American football) (1927–2019), American football player and coach
- John Ralston (musician), American rock musician
- John Ralston (chemist) (born 1946), Australian scientist and researcher
- John de Ralston (died 1452), Scottish bishop and administrator
- John T. Raulston (1868–1956), Tennessee judge who presided over the 1925 Scopes Trial
- John Steel Ralston (1887–1918), Scottish World War I flying ace
- John G. Ralston, American architect in Iowa
- John Ralston (baritone) (1882–1933), Australian baritone
- John Ralston (artist) (1789–1833), Scottish painter

== See also ==
- Jon Ralston (born 1959), Las Vegas, Nevada political reporter
- John Ralston Saul (born 1947), Canadian author and essayist
- John Ralston Williams (1874–1965), Canadian-American physician
