= Julia Gulliver =

American philosopher

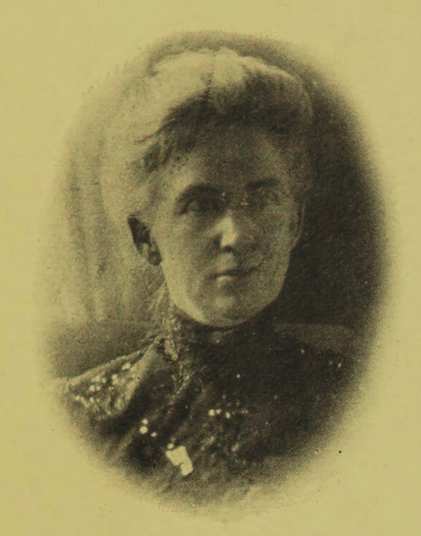
Julia H. Gulliver

Julia Henrietta Gulliver (July 30, 1856 – July 25, 1940) was an American philosopher, educator and college president. She was only the second woman in America to receive a Ph.D. in philosophy and was a tireless advocate for increased female representation in higher education.

== Background ==
Julia Henrietta Gulliver was born in Norwich, Connecticut, on July 30, 1856. She was the elder of two daughters in a family which also included two boys and two other children who did not survive early childhood.

Gulliver graduated high school in Binghamton, New York, and entered the first class of the newly founded Smith College in 1875. Her senior thesis on dreams was published in the Journal of Speculative Philosophy in the April 1880 issue. Gulliver received her doctorate degree from Smith in 1888. Her Ph.D. was the second graduate degree awarded by Smith College and it made her the second woman in America to earn a Ph.D. in philosophy.

In 1890, she became head of the Department of Philosophy and Biblical Literature at Rockford Female Seminary (renamed, Rockford College, 1892; now, Rockford University) in Rockford, Illinois. She studied at the University of Leipzig for two years where she was the only woman in a department of two hundred men. After Leipzig, she returned to Rockford Female Seminary, which had been renamed Rockford College. In 1902, she became president and set about reforming the institution, banning sororities. In 1906, she added a program of home economics and secretarial studies to the existing curriculum. During her 17 years as president, the endowment for the college was doubled and the college won national accreditation. In 1919, she retired and moved to Eustis, Florida.

In addition to her philosophical writings and work as president of Rockford College, Gulliver was an early advocate of higher education for women and lectured in favor of women's liberatory causes.

Gulliver died on July 25, 1940, in Eustis, Florida.

== Publications ==
Gulliver published several articles in philosophy as well as authored two books. She wrote on topics as diverse as free will, consciousness, religion, and democracy.

Her senior thesis, The Psychology of Dreams, was published in the Journal of Speculative Philosophy in April 1888. This discusses what affects the dreams in general. Starting from the memory, psychology and daily habits, it explores variable possibilities within the formation of the dreams and numerous catalysts that could be responsible for the experiential outcomes. It discusses physical affects as well that do occur to the brain while dreaming and being awake.

In her book Studies in Democracy, she argues that equality of opportunity is the fundamental value of democracy and that we should not expect equality of outcome given the variety of interests, ideals, and socioeconomic backgrounds of citizens. The value of democracy, Gulliver argued, is in its capacity for providing all citizens an equal chance to progress and in supporting a "wealth of varying opportunity." In this work, she also supported increased participation by women in political life, expecting that, as natural conservators and nurturers, they would increase peace and unity in society rather than discord and strife.

== Professional memberships ==
Gulliver was one of the first fifteen women to join the American Philosophical Association, as well as being active in the Religious Education Association.
