= 300 save club =

Group of pitchers with 300 or more regular-season saves in their careers

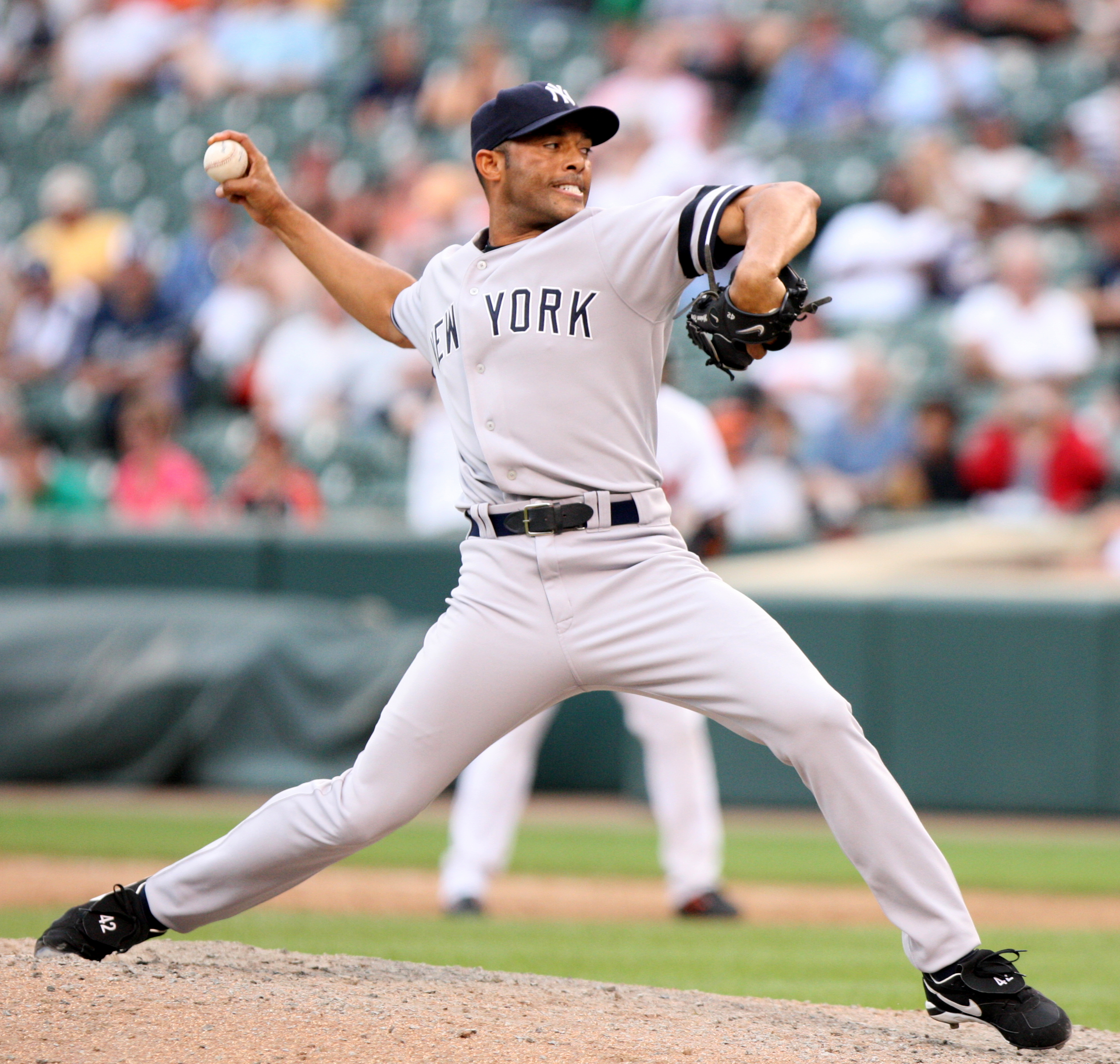
Mariano Rivera has the most career saves in Major League Baseball history with 652.

In Major League Baseball (MLB), the 300 save club is the group of pitchers who have recorded 300 or more regular-season saves in their careers. Most commonly a relief pitcher ("reliever" or "closer") earns a save by being the final pitcher of a game in which his team is winning by three or fewer runs and pitching at least one inning without losing the lead. The final pitcher of a game can earn a save by getting at least one batter out to end the game with the tying run on base, at bat, or on deck, or by pitching the last three innings without relinquishing the lead, regardless of score. The statistic was created by Jerome Holtzman in 1959 to "measure the effectiveness of relief pitchers" and was adopted as an official statistic by MLB in 1969. The save has been retroactively measured for past pitchers where applicable. Hoyt Wilhelm retired in 1972 and recorded just 31 saves from 1969 onwards, for example, but holds 228 total career saves.

Mariano Rivera holds the MLB save record with 652. Only Rivera and Trevor Hoffman have exceeded 500 or 600 saves, and Hoffman was the first to achieve either. Only nine pitchers have recorded 400 or more saves: Rivera, Hoffman, Kenley Jansen, Lee Smith, Craig Kimbrel, Francisco Rodríguez, John Franco, Billy Wagner, and most recently Aroldis Chapman.

Rollie Fingers was the first player to record 300 saves, reaching the mark on August 21, 1982. Aroldis Chapman is the most recent, achieving his 300th on August 26, 2021. The New York Mets are the only franchise to see three players reach the milestone while on their roster—John Franco, Billy Wagner, and Jason Isringhausen. In total, 31 players have recorded 300 or more saves in their career. Only nine relievers – Dennis Eckersley, Fingers, Goose Gossage, Hoffman, Rivera, Smith, Bruce Sutter, Wagner, and Wilhelm – have been inducted into the Baseball Hall of Fame; all but Wilhelm also have at least 300 saves. Jansen, Kimbrel, and Chapman are the only active players with more than 300 saves.

== Key ==
Player	Name of the player
SV	Total career saves
Date	Date of the pitcher's 300th save
Team	The pitcher's team for his 300th save
†	Elected to the Baseball Hall of Fame
‡	Player is active (Note: A player is considered inactive if he has announced his retirement or not played for a full season.)

== List ==
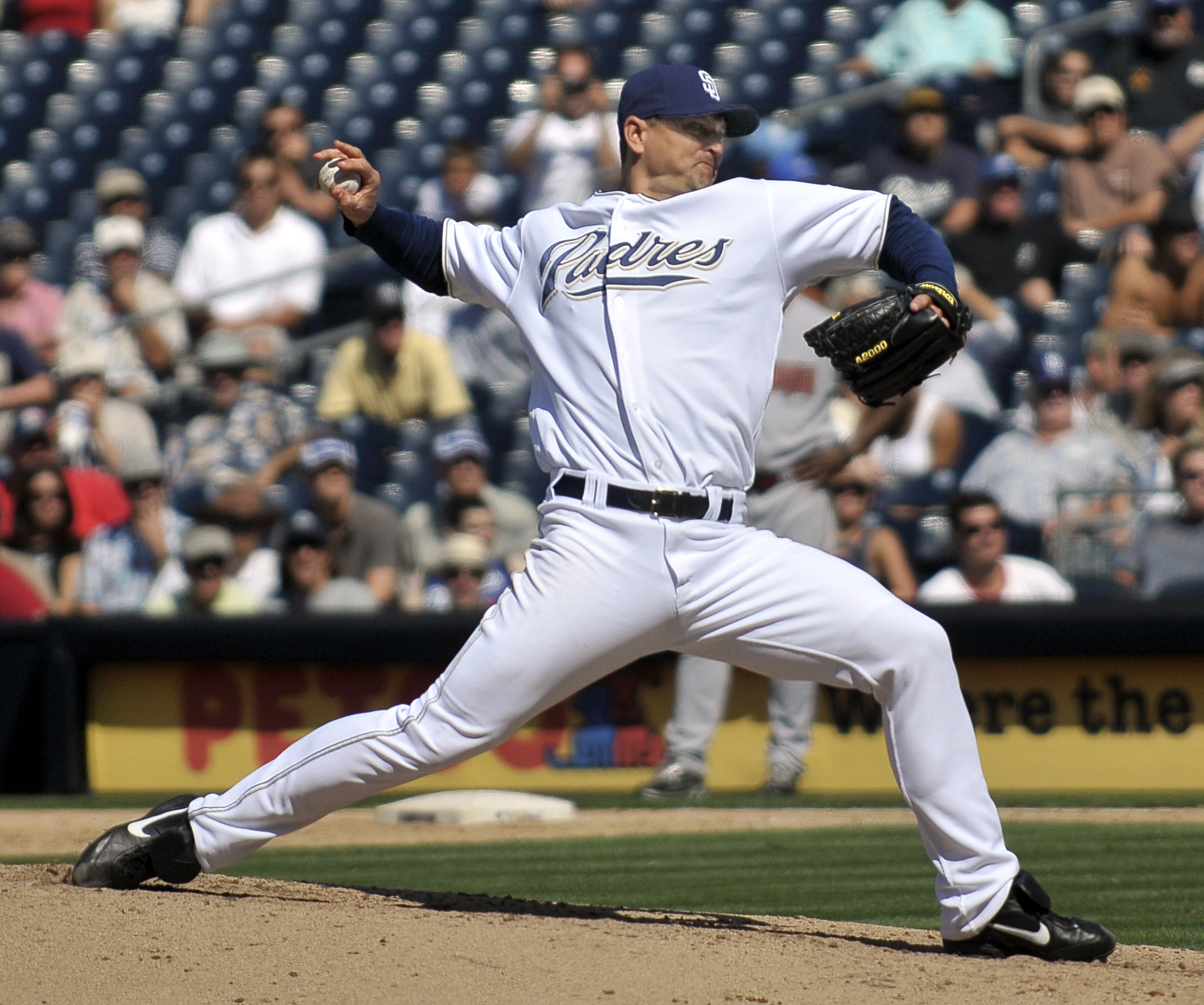
Trevor Hoffman was the first player to reach the 500 and 600 save milestones.

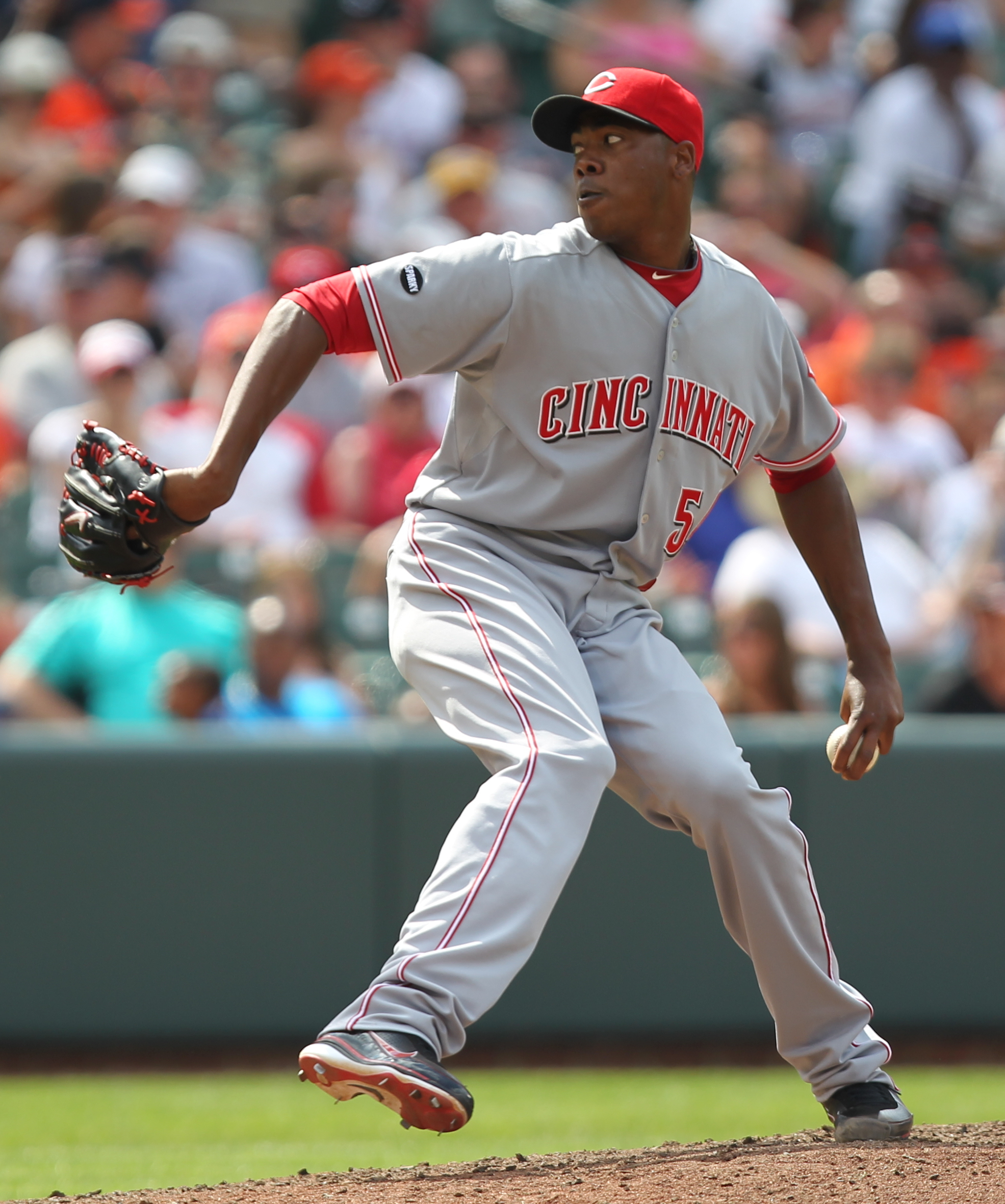
Aroldis Chapman, joining the club on August 26, 2021, is the most recent addition.

- Stats updated as of September 25, 2026.

Player	SV	300th save		Years active	Ref(s)
Player	SV	Date	Team	Years active	Ref(s)
Mariano Rivera^{†}	652	May 28, 2004	New York Yankees	1995–2013	
Trevor Hoffman^{†}	601	August 15, 2001	San Diego Padres	1993–2010	
Kenley Jansen^{‡}	498	September 25, 2019	Los Angeles Dodgers	2010–present	
Lee Smith^{†}	478	August 25, 1991	St. Louis Cardinals	1980–1997	
Craig Kimbrel^{‡}	441	May 5, 2018	Boston Red Sox	2010–present	
Francisco Rodríguez	437	June 22, 2013	Milwaukee Brewers	2002–2017	
John Franco	424	April 29, 1996	New York Mets	1984–2005	
Billy Wagner^{†}	422	July 4, 2006	New York Mets	1995–2010	
Aroldis Chapman^{‡}	402	August 26, 2021	New York Yankees	2010–present	
Dennis Eckersley^{†}	390	May 24, 1995	Oakland Athletics	1975–1998	
Joe Nathan	377	April 8, 2013	Texas Rangers	1999–2000, 2002–2009, 2011–2016	
Jonathan Papelbon	368	June 10, 2014	Philadelphia Phillies	2005–2016	
Jeff Reardon	367	May 20, 1991	Boston Red Sox	1979–1994	
Troy Percival	358	July 28, 2004	Anaheim Angels	1995–2005, 2007–2009	
Randy Myers	347	July 1, 1997	Baltimore Orioles	1985–1998	
Rollie Fingers^{†}	341	August 21, 1982	Milwaukee Brewers	1968–1985	
John Wetteland	330	May 12, 2000	Texas Rangers	1989–2000	
Francisco Cordero	329	June 1, 2011	Cincinnati Reds	1999–2012	
Fernando Rodney	327	September 22, 2017	Arizona Diamondbacks	2002–2003, 2005–2019	
Roberto Hernández	326	May 25, 2002	Kansas City Royals	1991–2007	
Huston Street	324	July 22, 2015	Los Angeles Angels of Anaheim	2005–2017	
José Mesa	321	April 27, 2005	Pittsburgh Pirates	1987, 1990–2007	
Todd Jones	319	September 16, 2007	Detroit Tigers	1993–2008	
Rick Aguilera	318	June 2, 2000	Chicago Cubs	1985–2000	
Robb Nen	314	August 6, 2002	San Francisco Giants	1993–2002	
Tom Henke	311	August 18, 1995	St. Louis Cardinals	1982–1995	
Goose Gossage^{†}	310	August 6, 1988	Chicago Cubs	1972–1989, 1991–1994	
Jeff Montgomery	304	August 25, 1999	Kansas City Royals	1987–1999	
Doug Jones	303	September 11, 1999	Oakland Athletics	1982–2000	
Jason Isringhausen	300	August 15, 2011	New York Mets	1995–2012	
Bruce Sutter^{†}	300	September 9, 1988	Atlanta Braves	1976–1986, 1988	

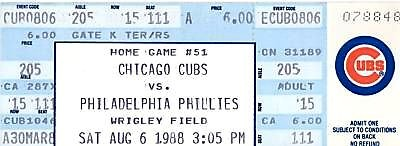
A ticket from the game where Goose Gossage became the second player in MLB history to earn 300 career saves on August 6, 1988.

== See also ==
- List of Major League Baseball annual saves leaders
- List of Major League Baseball career games finished leaders
- List of Major League Baseball career saves leaders
