= Kenneth Gulliver =

Australian cricketer

Personal information
- Born: 14 August 1913; East Maitland, New South Wales, Australia
- Died: 11 June 2001 (aged 87); Sydney, Australia
- Source: ESPNcricinfo, 30 December 2016

Kenneth Gulliver (14 August 1913 – 11 June 2001) was an Australian cricketer. He played twelve first-class matches for New South Wales between 1936/37 and 1945/46.

== See also ==
- List of New South Wales representative cricketers
