= Ralston Cash =

American baseball pitcher (born 1991)

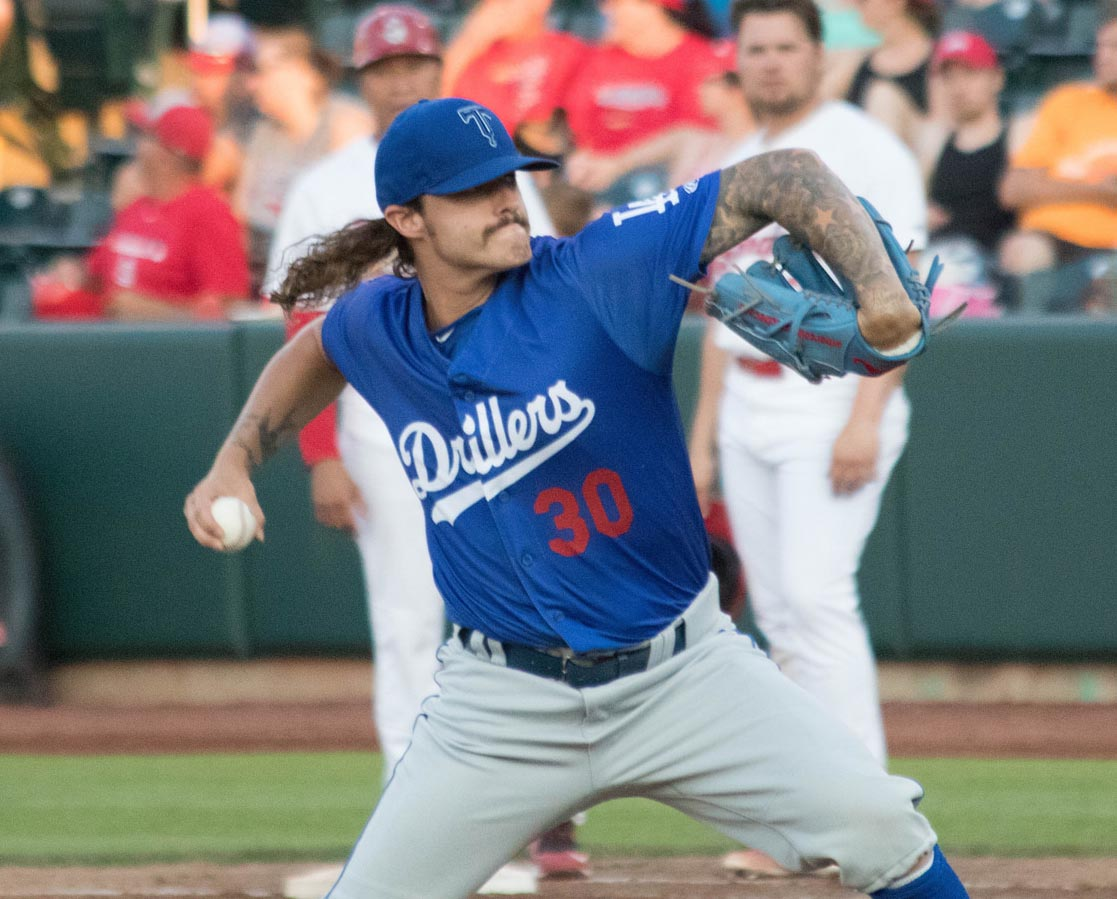
- Ralston Cash with the AA Tulsa Drillers
- Pitcher
- Born: August 20, 1991 (age 34); Cornelia, Georgia
- Bats: Right Throws: Right
- Stats at Baseball Reference

Ralston Alexander Cash (born August 20, 1991) an American former professional baseball pitcher.

== Career ==
=== Los Angeles Dodgers ===
Cash attended Lakeview Academy in Georgia and was drafted by the Los Angeles Dodgers in the 2nd round of the 2010 MLB draft. He played in 2010 for the Ogden Raptors and the Arizona League Dodgers. Major hip surgery ended his season early and caused him to miss the entire 2011 season. He returned to action with the Great Lakes Loons of the Midwest League in 2012, where he was 1–6 with a 6.42 ERA in nine games. In 2013, also with Great Lakes, he was 4–3 with a 3.19 ERA in 16 games (eight starts). He transitioned to the bullpen in 2014 where he was in 29 games for the Loons and another six for the Chattanooga Lookouts of the Double-A Southern League. He was 3–1 with a 2.90 ERA combined. In 2015, with the new Double–A affiliate, the Tulsa Drillers of the Texas League he was 2–6 with a 3.47 ERA in a career-high 49 games. After the season, he played for the Glendale Desert Dogs in the Arizona Fall League and was named to the league's Fall Stars Game. He returned to Tulsa to start the 2016 season. He was 5–3 with a 3.00 ERA in 29 appearances for the Drillers and was then promoted to Triple-A Oklahoma City Dodgers, where he was 4–0 with a 2.62 ERA in 17 appearances. After the season, the Dodgers assigned Cash to the Glendale Desert Dogs of the Arizona Fall League.

Cash announced on his Instagram page, that he had been released by the Dodgers on August 14, 2017.

=== Seattle Mariners ===
On August 16, 2017, Cash signed a minor league contract with the Seattle Mariners. In five games for the Double–A Arkansas Travelers, he posted a 1.93 ERA with 4 strikeouts in 4 2/3 innings pitched. Cash elected free agency following the season on November 6.

=== Los Angeles Angels ===
On November 28, 2017, he signed a minor league contract with the Baltimore Orioles organization. Via his Instagram, he announced that he had been released on March 27, 2018. The next day, he signed a minor league contract with the Los Angeles Angels organization. Cash made 47 relief appearances split between the Double–A Mobile BayBears and Triple–A Salt Lake Bees, accumulating a 7–4 record and 6.08 ERA with 77 strikeouts across 66 2/3 innings pitched. He elected free agency following the season on November 2, 2018.

== Personal life ==
Cash founded the "Ralston Cash Foundation", which is a non-profit organization that buys Christmas presents for children who have lost a parent to cancer.
