= Gulliver Ralston =

British musician

Gulliver Ralston (born 1978) is a British musician living in Oxford, England.

== Education ==
Ralston was a chorister in the choir of Christ Church Cathedral, Oxford. He read music at New College, Oxford, where he held an alto choral scholarship. After graduating he won a graduate award to write a D.Phil on Richard Wagner at St Peter's College, Oxford where he was Director of Musical Performance from 2003 to 2005.

== Career ==
Gulliver Ralston was artistic director of the Brinkburn Festival, and Director of Music at Oxford's University Church. He has worked with a number of orchestras, including the Royal Northern Sinfonia.

He has taught nineteenth and twentieth-century music history in Oxford, where he was also tutor for the Sarah Lawrence Programme at Wadham College. He has lectured for the Royal Academy of Arts and the Oxford Lieder Festival, and has written for The New Culture Forum, Literary Review, Eighteenth Century Music, Early Music and Wagner.

Ralston has also been assistant conductor with The National Orchestra of Lebanon and directed The National Orchestra of Malta and The Band of Instruments. He has been musical director for productions of Hansel and Gretel, Così fan tutte, Die Entführung, Il barbiere di Siviglia, Le nozze di Figaro, La Bohème, Noye's Fludde and Eight Songs for a Mad King. In 2014, he conducted the European premier of John Peel and M.D. Usher's opera Neron Kaisar.

Ralston has worked extensively with young voices. His recording with the Hildegard Choir of newly discovered works by Vaughan Williams and Liszt received glowing reviews from The Liszt Society and The Classical Review, and he gives frequent workshops for choirs. In 2011 he was invited by the Zimbabwe Academy of Music in Bulawayo to work with over 1600 children across Zimbabwe, and the educational programme at the Brinkburn Festival involved the 2500 pupils spread across the five campuses of the Northumberland Church of England Academy.

After an invitation by West End star Peter Straker, Gulliver joined his band as the pianist, alongside guitarist Mike Allison. He later worked as pianist for Fascinating Aïda's Dillie Keane, performing at the Edinburgh Fringe and on tour in the UK. Gulliver also performs the songs of Gershwin, Noël Coward, and Tom Lehrer, often with baritone Colin Baldy.

From 2013 to 2024 he was Director of Music at the University of Roehampton in London where, between 2018 and 2022 he was also Head of Digby Stuart College.

Ralston has been Chairman of the Scottish charity Glen Art which helps those from a military background return to civilian life.

On 21 September 2016, he performed alongside Dillie Keane from comedy cabaret trio Fascinating Aida at the Theatre Royal Windsor.
