= Ralston Steel Car Company =

Rolling stock manufacturer

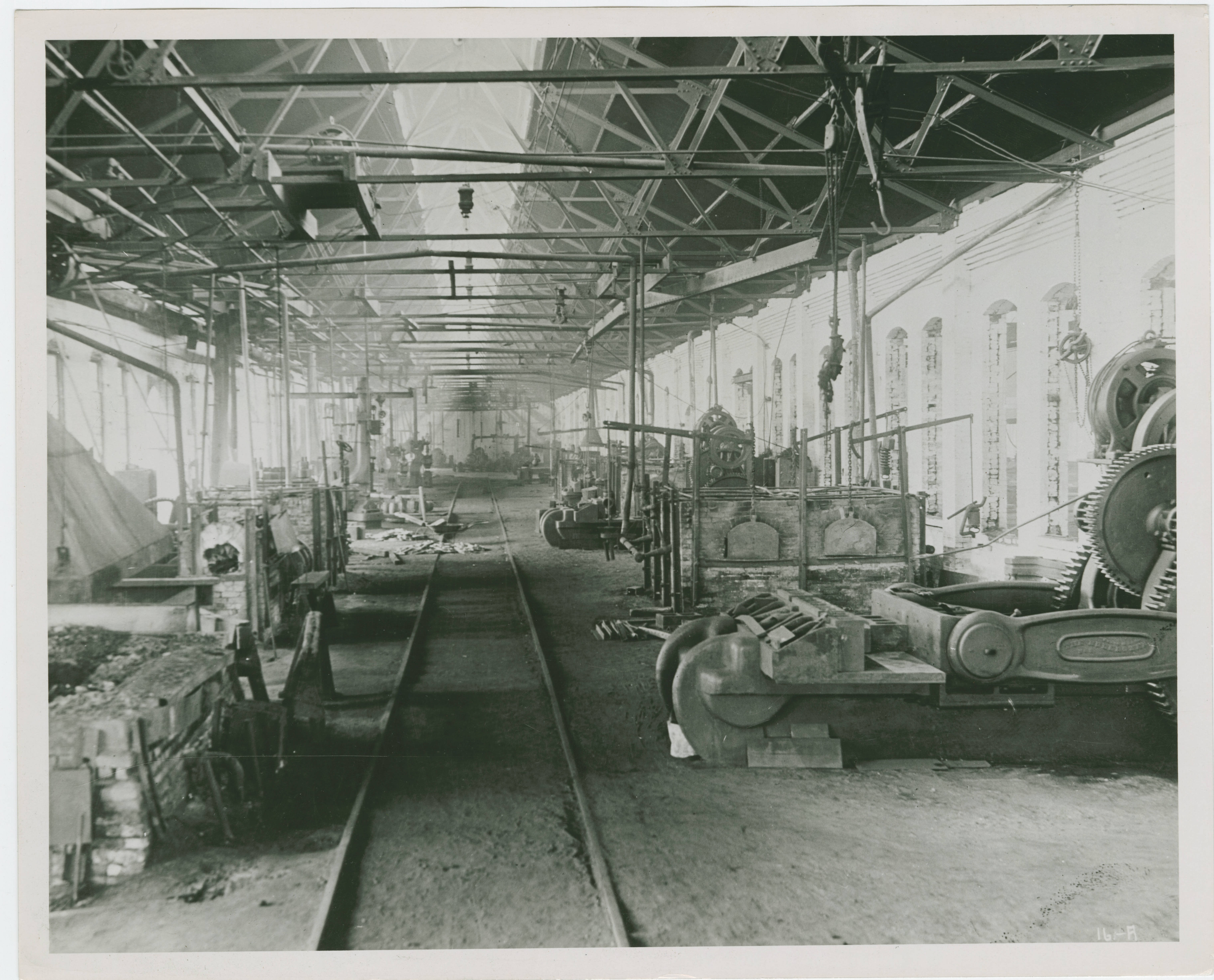
The company's forge shop

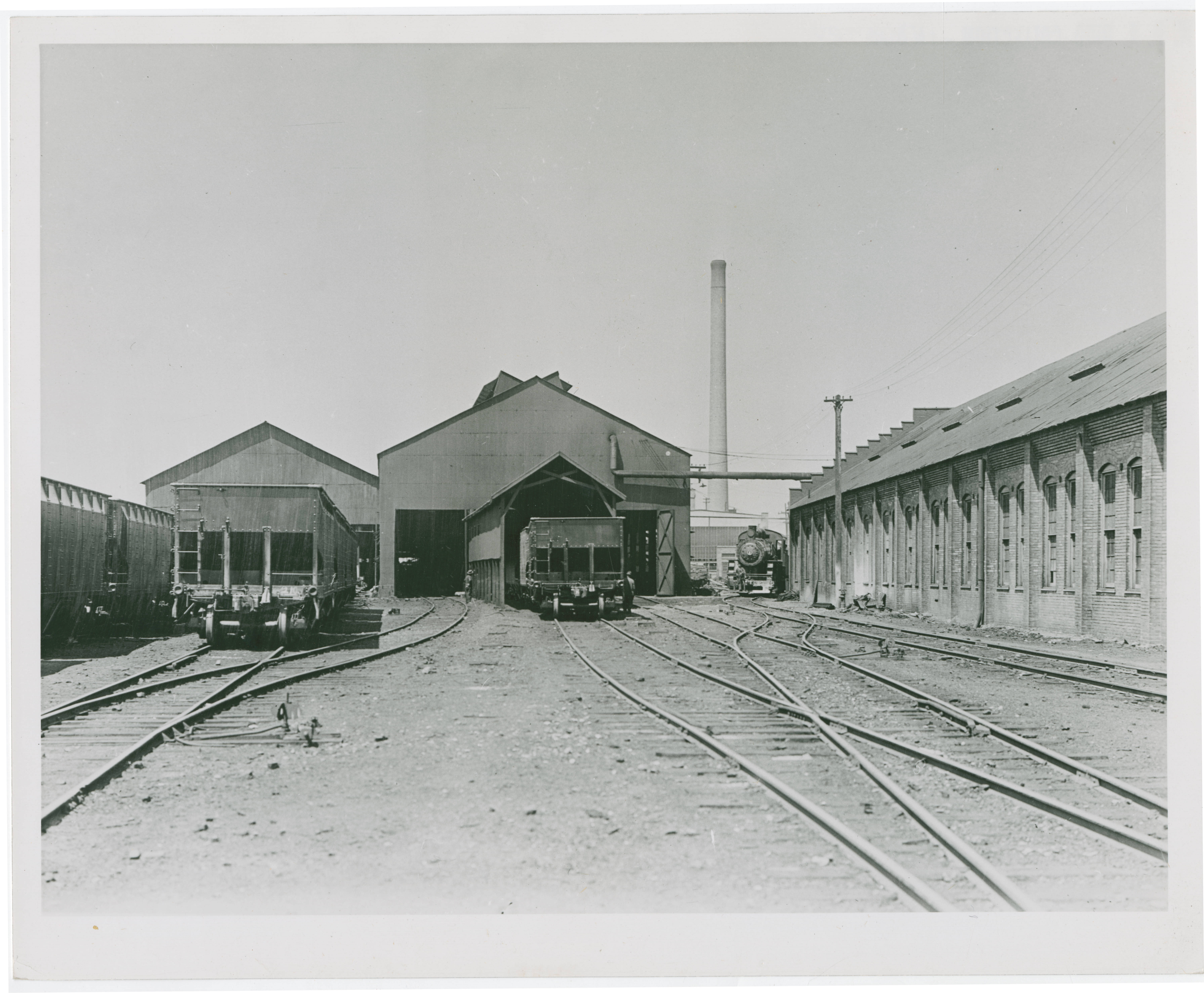
Train yard

The Ralston Steel Car Company was a rail car manufacturer in Columbus, Ohio, from 1905 to 1953. The company began by modifying wood freight cars to add steel underframes. Later it manufactured its own line of all-steel rail cars.

== Founding ==
Joseph S. Ralston and Anton Becker founded the Ralston Steel Car Company in 1905 by purchasing the plant of the Rarig Engineering Company on the east side of Columbus. Becker had just patented a drop-bottom gondola car which would allow the automatic unloading of coal and ballast cars (hopper cars). Prior to this invention, cars were unloaded by hand shoveling. An example of a Ralston-built drop gondola can be seen here.

== Expansion ==
Wood freight cars could not take the strain of being pulled by increasingly powerful steam locomotives, resulting in an explosion of demand for Ralston's all-steel cars. By 1907, expansion of the Rarig facility began with the construction of a 1,400-foot (430 m) long Punch, Shear Fitting and Erection Shop. By 1910, a wide variety of cars were being produced.

== Depression, World War II Surge, and Decline ==
During the Great Depression, orders fell off precipitously. However, the build-up to World War II in the late 1930s revived production. Employment reached 700 by the summer of 1940, with an average 25 to 30 cars produced per day, and peak output of 40 possible.

After the war, the surplus of cars manufactured during it undermined new production. Ralston was unable to ride out the slowdown, and shut its doors in 1953.

== See also ==
- List of rolling stock manufacturers
