= Reclaim =

Reclaim, reclaimed, reclaimer, reclaiming or reclamation means "to get something back".

It may refer to:

- Land reclamation, creating new land from oceans, riverbeds, or lake beds
- Land rehabilitation, restoring disturbed land to its former state
- Dedesertification, reversing of the land degradation in arid and semi-arid regions
- Mine reclamation, restoring land that has been mined to a usable state
- Stream restoration, improving the environmental health of streams and rivers
- Street reclamation, to increase non-car uses of streets
- Nature's reclamation, a form of rewilding that allows natural processes to reclaim territory

== Materials ==
- Reclaimed water, converting wastewater into water that can be used for other purposes
- Mechanically separated meat, a paste-like meat product
- Landfill mining, excavation and processing of materials from landfills
- Materials recovery facility, a specialized plant that receives, separates and prepares recyclable materials
- Refrigerant reclamation
- Crumb rubber or reclaimed rubber, recycled rubber produced from automotive scrap tires
- Reclaimed asphalt pavement, removed pavement materials containing asphalt and aggregates
- Full depth recycling, a process that rebuilds worn-out asphalt pavements by recycling the existing roadway
- Sand reclamation, reclamation of stamp sand previously dumped in the water
- Reclaimed lumber, reuse of processed wood primarily for decoration and home building
- Ecohouse, made with reclaimed materials

== Politics ==
- Reclaimed word or reappropriation, a pejorative word or slur used as an affirmation with positive connotation
- Individual reclamation, the theft of resources by the poor from the rich
- Reclaiming Patriotism, in Australia
- Reclaim Australia: Reduce Immigration
- Reclaim Australia, a far-right political party
- Reclaim the Streets, anti-car/pro-public-spaces movement
- Reclaim the Dream commemorative march, in the US
- Reclaim The Records, a movement to increase availability of public records in the US
- "Reclaiming my time", a phrase used by Maxine Waters
- Reclaiming Health and Safety For All, a report in the UK
- Reclaim Party, a British political party founded by actor Laurence Fox in 2020

== Law ==
- Presidential power reclamation, covered by the twenty-fifth Amendment to the United States Constitution
- Citizenship reclamation, part of the German Citizenship Project
- United States Bureau of Reclamation, a federal agency which oversees water resource management
- Newlands Reclamation Act, a 1902 United States federal law that funded irrigation projects
  - Reclamation fund, a special fund established by the 1902 law
- Reclamation district, special-purpose districts which are responsible for reclaiming and maintaining threatened land
- Surface Mining Control and Reclamation Act of 1977, a 1977 law in the US
- Three Kids Mine Remediation and Reclamation Act, a 2013 law in the US
- RECLAIM Act, a proposed 2017 mining reclamation law in the US
- Regional Clean Air Incentives Market (RECLAIM), an emissions trading program in California

== Religion ==
- Center for Reclaiming America for Christ
- Reclaiming (Neopaganism), a Pagan earth-based spirituality movement

== As a synonym for rehabilitation ==
- Reclaiming Futures, a non-profit in the US
- Reclamation of fallen women, by the Church penitentiary in the UK
- Rehabilitation (penology), re-integration into society of a convicted person

== As a synonym for sewage treatment ==
- Clark County Water Reclamation District, Clark County, Nevada, US
- Metropolitan Water Reclamation District of Greater Chicago, Illinois, US
- Riverside Park Water Reclamation Facility, Spokane, Washington, US
- Thomas P. Smith Water Reclamation Facility, Tallahassee, Florida, US
- Tillman Water Reclamation Plant, Los Angeles, California, US

== Music ==
- Reclaim (album), 2003 album by Keep of Kalessin
- Reclaim Australia (album), 2016 album by A.B. Original
- Reclamation (Bigwig album), 2006
- Reclamation (Candlelight Red album), 2013
- Reclamation (Front Line Assembly album), 1997
- Reclaimed (radio show) in Canada

== Technology ==
- Samsung Reclaim, an eco-friendly feature phone with a sliding keyboard
- Reclaimer, a machine used to handle bulk materials
- Baggage reclaim in airports, see also Baggage carousel
- HMS Reclaim
- USS Reclaimer (ARS-42), a 1945 salvage ship
- Reclaim helmet, a type of diving helmet

== Other uses ==
- Reclaim (film), a 2014 thriller film starring John Cusack and Ryan Phillippe
- Reclaimed (TV series), a 2020 Discovery Channel USA reality television program about mining, hunting, backcountry camping/cottages, and land claims
- Reclaimed factories, a form of workers' self-management in socialism
- Reclaimed Space, an American company

== See also ==
- Reclaimer (disambiguation)
- Claim (disambiguation)
- Restoration (disambiguation)
