= Ukrainian orthography of 1933 =

Ukrainian spelling rules adopted in 1933

The Ukrainian orthography of 1933 (Ukrainian: Український правопис 1933 року, romanized: Ukrainskyi pravopys 1933 roku) is the Ukrainian orthography, adopted in 1933 in Kharkiv, the capital of the Ukrainian SSR. It began the process of artificial convergence of Ukrainian and Russian language traditions of orthography. Some norms that were rejected due to their absence in the Russian orthography were returned to the Ukrainian orthography of 2019.

== On the eve of the reform ==
In the 1920s, Ukrainian linguistics flourished, and considerable work was done to standardize the Ukrainian literary language, scientific terminology, and dictionaries. The work of scientists was marked by the publication of the Ukrainian orthography in 1928, which for the first time became official and unified for the whole of Ukraine. The Academic Russian-Ukrainian Dictionary, ed. Ahatanhel Krymskyi. However, the codification of 1928–1929, which combined the Dnieper and Transdniestrian language norms in one orthographic code, proved unsatisfactory under those political circumstances and required changes.

== The beginning of repression and Russification ==
In the early 1930s, a wave of total planned Russification swept over Ukraine under the slogans of the struggle against Ukrainian nationalism.

The "new era" of Soviet policy in relation to Ukrainian culture, as well as language, began after the resolution of the Central Committee of the CPSU (b) on April 3, 1932, "On the Suppression of Nationalism in Ukraine" and the introduction of communist ideas throughout. To do this, Pavel Postyshev was sent to Ukraine, and he arrived in the capital, Kharkiv, in January 1933. He forcibly cleansed Ukraine of "nationalists." On July 7, 1933, Mykola Skrypnyk committed suicide without enduring torture. Members of the Presidium of the Orthography Commission Vsevolod Hantsov, A. Prykhodko, S. Pylypenko were repressed (Oleksa Syniavsky and A. Krymskyi were later repressed). The orthography looked for the "nationalist wreckage" needed to fight the Ukrainian national revival.

== Eradication of specific features of the Ukrainian language ==
To destroy and stop the flourishing of the Ukrainian language in general, and the literary language in particular, the Bolsheviks first undertook with other people's hands - this was undertaken by Andrii Khvylia (real name Olinter) and N. Kaganovych. In fact, they were the first to make a fuss, as if in Ukrainian linguistics it was a bourgeois-chauvinistic destructive method, which A. Khvylia consolidated in his sad memory with the book "Eradicate, Destroy the Roots of Ukrainian Nationalism on the Linguistic Front", Kharkiv, 1933, printed 15,000 copies.

A. Khvylia, chairman of the newly created 1933 Orthography Commission at the People's Commissariat of Education, stated:

The orthography adopted by M. Skrypnyk on September 6, 1928, directed the development of the Ukrainian language to Polish and Czech bourgeois culture. This put a barrier between the Ukrainian and Russian languages, hampered the study of literacy by the broad working masses. (…). The commission set up by the NGO was revised „Ukrainian orthography“ (…). The main corrections concerned the elimination of all rules that focused the Ukrainian language on the Polish and Czech bourgeois cultures, distorted the modern Ukrainian language, and set a barrier between the Ukrainian and Russian languages. (…). Deadly conservative norms established by nationalists, distorting the modern Ukrainian language, the living language of the practice of the working masses of Ukraine, have been thrown out.

Without any discussions or conferences, the said Commission "revised" and in 1933 issued new rules. The letter ґ was dropped from the alphabet, the spelling of foreign words was radically changed, and paradigms of declension tokens were changed. About 126 amendments have been made to the rules, the section on orthography of foreign words has been completely changed. The new orthography rules were first published in the journal "Polytechnic Education" (933, No. 6), at the end of 1933 they were published in a separate book "Ukrainian orthography".

With accusations of drive a wedge between Russian and Ukrainian language practices:

- Removed dual forms (дві книзі, три вербі, чотири хаті, дві руці та ін.).
- The use of the genitive case in the forms: бачу молодиці, веду хлопці, дивлюся на піонерки.
- From parallel forms бабів and баб, хатів and хат, губів and губ, статтів and статей only those closest to the Russian version are left.
- From parallel word-forming variants становисько — становище, огнисько — огнище, гноїсько — гноїще preference is given to the formation with an extension (suffix) -ище.
- Parallel forms of the dative and (singular) locative cases of nouns of the second declension святові — святу, серцеві — серцю, сонцеві — сонцю, у русі — у рухові limited to forms on -у (ю), common with Russian forms.
- Alternation of prefixes (prepositions) з — с before voiceless consonants к, п, т, х was distributed on ф:

Orthography of 1928	Orthography of 1933
зфалшувати	сфальшувати
зфотографувати	сфотографувати

- The inscription of the foreign words бакханка, барбаризм on the Latin model is returned to the East Ukrainian variants developed under the influence of the Russian languages: вакханка, варваризм, as well as претенсія, іхтіосавр, бронтосавр, (legalized претензія, іхтіозавр, бронтозавр), радіюс, консиліюм, медіюм, Маріюпіль (legalized радіус, консиліум, медіум, Маріуполь).
- The use of the endings of the dative singular of the masculine singular (-ові, -еві/-єві) is simplified. According to the previous orthography, masculine nouns should have the endings -ові, -еві/-єві, and the use of the ending -у/-ю is limited. Further reforms simplified and generalized the use of these forms, preferring a similar Russian ending -у/-ю.
- There is a hard spelling of a number of adjectives:

Orthography of 1928	Orthography of 1933
західній	західний
східній	східний
трикутній	трикутний

- The ending -и in the genitive singular for feminine nouns with two consonants at the end of the base was replaced by -і:

Orthography of 1928	Orthography of 1933
до смерти	до смерті
без совісти	без совісті
без чести	без честі

- Consistent with the etymology of writing alternating vowels:

Orthography of 1928	Orthography of 1933
випроваджати	випроводжати
голодівка	голодовка
манастир	монастир
мариво	марево
салітра	селітра
соняшний	сонячний
шаравари	шаровари

- In indirect cases, Ukrainian surnames received new endings:

Last name	Orthography of 1928	Orthography of 1933
Гончар	до Гончаря	до Гончара
Кравців	до Кравцова	до Кравціва
Мазурок	до Мазурка	до Мазурока
Швець	до Шевця	до Швеця

- Geographical names are Russified. According to the 1928 orthography, the names of cities had to be transmitted "in writing in their folk-historical form" (§ 81), and the Orthography of 1933 required to be transmitted "as accepted by the Soviet authorities" (§ 89):

Orthography of 1928	Orthography of 1933
Басарабія	Бесарабія
Берестя	Брест
Білгород	Бєлгород
Бердянське	Бердянськ
Букарешт	Бухарест
Єйське	Єйськ
Дін	Дон
Кахівка	Каховка
Кремінчук	Кременчук
Лубні	Лубни
Луганське	Луганськ
Мелітопіль	Мелітополь
Маріюпіль	Маріуполь
Мукачів	Мукачеве
Прилука	Прилуки
Рівне	Ровно
Ромен	Ромни
Ростів	Ростов
Севастопіль	Севастополь
Симферопіль	Симферополь
Сальське	Сальськ
Таганріг	Таганрог
Тираспіль	Тирасполь
Теодосія	Феодосія
Новозибків	Новозибков
Озівське море	Азовське море
Острогозьке	Острогозьк
Пинське	Пінск

The names of the cities began to end in -ськ, -цьк (not -ське, -цьке): Волочинське, Старобільське, Пинське, Зінов'ївське, Луцьке, etc.

Such names as nouns began to be distinguished: із Старобільська, під Волочинськом, and not as adjectives: із Старобільського, під Волочинським.

Adjectives formed from the names of cities перемиський, радомиський, inverted on перемишльський, радомишльський.

- It is practiced to avoid nouns in cases when they do not repeat the Russian use: preposition до in pairs with до школи, до Києва successively replaced by a preposition у — у школу, у Київ.
- Constructions with impersonal adjectives have disappeared from use in the UkrSSR: випуск машин припинено, злочинця затримано; натомість процвітає суржикування: випуск машин припинений, злочинець затриманий.
- Artificially divided adjective дружній of two adjectives: дружний and дружній, the difference between them can be established only by putting them with Russian counterparts дружный and дружественный. The same operation is done with the word багатир. Two words are artificially made from one word: багатир (rich) and богатир (vytiaz, knight, hero).
- Introduction of new terminology copied from Russian in all fields of knowledge:

Specific Ukrainian form	Russian form	Russified Ukrainian form
Великий Віз	Большая Медведица	Велика Ведмедиця
городина	овощи	овочі
садовина	фрукты	фрукти
дієйменник	инфинитив	інфінітив
живе срібло	ртуть	ртуть
родзинки	изюм	ізюм
стоп	сплав	сплав
риска	тире	тир

- The names of people are standardized in accordance with the Eastern Ukrainian tradition:

Orthography of 1928	Orthography of 1933
Агатангел	Агафангел
Тадей	Фадей and Тадей
Теодосій	Феодосій
Олександер	Олександр

- Because the letter ґ was removed from the alphabet, foreign proper names with h and g began to be given with only one letter г, regardless of pronunciation (§ 76):

Orthography of 1928	Orthography of 1933
Гаронна	Гаронна
Ґете	Гете
Гаммерфест	Гаммерфест

- Vocabulary from the Greek language with the letter θ (Cyrillic Fita) was changed according to the Eastern Ukrainian model:

Orthography of 1928	Orthography of 1933
анатема	анафема
Атени	Афіни
Методій	Мефодій
Теофанія	Феофанія

- The sound combination ія in foreign words, approved by the orthography of 1928, has been replaced by the Russian practice іа: (Note: A common language defect in the pronunciation of -iя- under the new rules of 1928 was noted in the advisers of the time: «…in words of foreign origin pronunciation іа, but it is necessary ія» Zhovtobriukh Mykhailo Andriiovych Essay on the history of Ukrainian Soviet linguistics (1918—1941), К., 1991, P. 68.)

Orthography of 1928	Orthography of 1933
варіянт	варіант
комедіянт	комедіант
Сіям	Сіам

- German diphthong еі, that sounds like Ukrainian ай, got the Russian spelling ей:

Orthography of 1928	Orthography of 1933
Айнштайн	Ейнштейн
Гайне	Гейне
капельмайстер	капельмейстер

- In borrowed words with a soft l, the East Ukrainian pronunciation of a hard l is affirmed: (Note: From time immemorial, as our sights show, we have not had the habit of pronouncing foreign words ґ and ль, but pronounced them in their own way (that is, in Greek): Платон, Іларіон, Лонгин, грек, Іспанія, Ірина (not Плятон, Іляріон, Льонгін, ґрек, Еспанія, Ірена), etc. This is the so-called Greek system of pronunciation of foreign words, and in fact it is strongly ingrained in our language in princely times, and remains dominant in the people until the present time.» Ohiienko Ivan. History of the Ukrainian literary language. К., 2001.)

Orthography of 1928	Orthography of 1933
Ля-Манш	Ла-Манш
лямпа	лампа
пляц	плац

- The spelling of foreign words according to the Russian pattern is organized:

Orthography of 1928		Orthography of 1933
a.	генеза	генезис
a.	криза	кризис
a.	теза	тезис
b.	Геллада	Еллада
b.	гієроґліф	іерогліф (Note: «…always written іа, іе, іу, еа, except for the position at the end of the word...» (§ 79, P. 61))
b.	гістерія	істерія
b.	гураґан	ураган
c.	Арабія	Аравія
c.	Бакх	Вакх
c.	Теби	Фіви
d.	амнестія	амністія
d.	хемія	хімія
d.	метода	метод
d.	роля	роль
d.	спіраля	спіраль
f.	міністер	міністр
f.	Олександер	Олександр
f.	циліндер	циліндр
g.	евнух	євнух
g.	Европа	as it was Европа (§ 79, P. 62)
g.	епархія	єпархія
g.	Еспанія	Іспанія
h.	ґолф	гольф
h.	мусулманин	мусульманин
h.	носталгія	ностальгія
h.	шелф	шельф
i.	авдиторія	аудиторія
i.	авдієнція	аудіенція (§ 82, P. 63)
i.	клявза	кляуза
j.	вуаль masculine gender	вуаль feminine gender
j.	деталь masculine gender	деталь feminine gender
j.	емаль masculine gender	емаль feminine gender
j.	модель masculine gender	модель feminine gender
k.	евфорія	ейфорія
k.	невтральний	нейтральний
k.	неврологія	нейрологія
l.	авул	аул
l.	богдохан	богдихан
l.	Букарешт	Бухарест
l.	вермічелі	вермішель
l.	данець; & данський	датчанин; & датський
l.	маштаб	масштаб
l.	моххамеданин	магометанин
l.	претенсія	претензія

- Normalized accents:

Orthography of 1928	Orthography of 1933
доне́змогу	донезмо́ги
душни́й	ду́шний
за́їзд	заї́зд
о́сідок	осі́док
по́душка	поду́шка

== Russification of terminology and vocabulary ==
After the physical massacre of linguists, the terminological case suffered another blow. Special brigades were set up to review dictionaries and remove "nationalist" words and terms; by violent methods all terminology (technical, scientific) is brought into full compliance with the Russian. Even in linguistics, Russian grammatical terminology has been introduced, rejecting all the achievements of Ukrainian scholars.

The "orthographic" reform has actually turned into a struggle with the original and authentic features of the Ukrainian language. To this end, Andriy Khvylia, a fighter against "nationalism" in linguistics, himself later repressed for nationalism, put forward the following demands to the party's supervisory bodies for terminological activities:

- Stop publishing all dictionaries immediately;
- Review dictionaries and all terminology;
- Unify technical terminology with the terminology that exists in the Soviet Union and is used in Ukraine;
- Review the cadres on the language front and expel bourgeois-nationalist elements from this front;
- Review orthography.

Ukrainian vocabulary was made dependent on Russian, there was a systematic elimination of specific Ukrainian vocabulary and its replacement by Russian. For example:

Orthography of 1928	Orthography of 1933
гуртовий	оптовий
дбайливий	бережливий
досить	достатньо
зазіхання	посягання
обставати за /обстоювати/ що	ратувати за що

Specific Ukrainian word закотистий (закотистий комір) removed from dictionaries and introduced words відкладний (відкладний комір), because it repeats the Russian form отложной (отложной воротник).

When the compilers of the 1933 Orthography were repressed, in circumstances of fear and language chaos, all periodicals, as well as publishing houses in the UkrSSR, regularly received lists of words to avoid from the leading Communist party publication.

Exactly the same language policy is applied to the Belarusian language. Also in 1933, a new Belarusian spelling was introduced — "Narkamaŭka", about 30 phonetic and morphological features, taken from the Russian language, were introduced into the Belarusian language. Active Russification of Belarusian vocabulary began by directing the lexicographic practice.

== Text ==
Khvylia, Andrii, ed. (1933). Ukrainian orthography. Kharkiv: Soviet school. (Alternate link:.)

== See also ==
- Ukrainian orthography of 1928
- Russification of Ukraine
- Chronology of Ukrainian language suppression
- Ukrainian orthography of 1960
- Draft Ukrainian orthography of 1999
- Ukrainian orthography of 2019

== Sources ==
- Караванський С. Секрети української мови. Науково-популярна розвідка з додатком словничків репресованої та занедбаної української лексики. — К. : УКСП «Кобза», 1994. — 152 с. — ISBN 5-87274-051-4.
- Німчук В. Проблеми українського правопису в XX ст.
- Огієнко І. І сторія української літературної мови. — Київ, 2001. — (Перше видання — Вінніпег, 1949).
- Larysa Masenko. Ukrainian Language in the 20th Century: History of Linguocide: documents and materials / Masenko, Larysa. KM-Academy, 2005. Kyiv. ISBN 966-518-314-1.
