= Kravtsov family (Orenburg) =

Kravtsovs of Orenburg
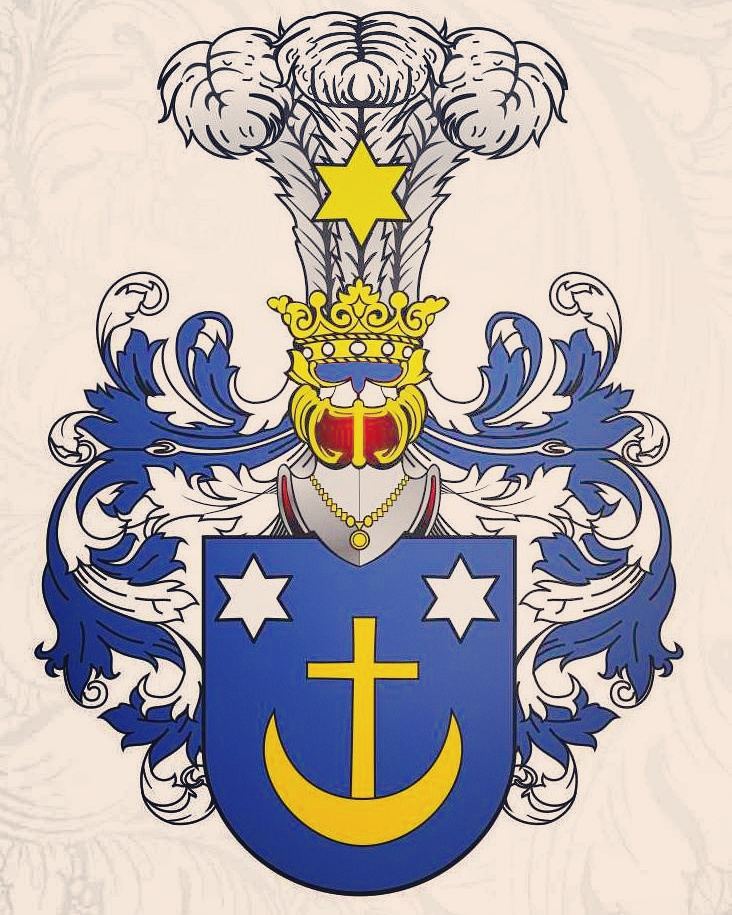
- Azure, fitchée cross over a crescent, between two stars. On a crowned helmet, three ostrich feathers, charged with a star.
- Country: Russian Empire
- Motto: Virtute et Armis (by Valor and Arms)
- Estate: Gorbatovka

The Kravtsov of Orenburg family (Russian: Кравцовы (Оренбургские)) is the name of Russian noble family of Scottish-Russian origin. The family is enlisted into the pedigree books of the Orenburg Cossacks Host and Nizhny Novgorod Governorate.

== Family history ==
Due to the genealogical tale the family descends from Dunaghe Mangarmov of Scottish origin, he was a mercenary and was recruited to regiment under the command of William Grim, later under captain-rittmeister Jacob Shaw in Irish company. First in the Polish-Lithuanian service, but during the siege of the fortress of Bely in 1614 his regiment switched sides, surrendered the fortress and took service with Russia. Later regiment participated in several Russo-Crimean Wars against Crimean–Nogai raids. It is possible that they are the same with major Macgermerie/Montgomery, who was a Scottish officer in Swedish service since 1629 in several regiments. He probably served at the Battle of Wittstock in 1636. In 1639 he became a lieutenant in Robert Monroe's recruited infantry regiment before transferring to Alexander Cunningham's recruited regiment. Due to Ed. Furgol this is probably the man who served in the Earl of Eglinton's Horse in the Army of the Solemn League and Covenant in 1644. Since 1655 back in Polish-Lithuanian service at Thorn city with Colonel Cranston's regiment and later in Russia, in Patrick Gordon's Regiment of Horse. Major Macgermerie-Montgomery was at a party at Patrick Gordon's house, quarreled with his host and had to duel with him. His son Yakov was moved to Samara Fortress, that was a front line post protecting the then easternmost boundaries of Russia from forays of nomads under command of voivode Afanasii von Vissinov.

In petition for land granting to the Orenburg Host Administration written in 1789 by ober-ofizer Dmitri Kravtsov in which he, mentioned that his grandfather was sent with hundred men under his command from one of Volga garrisons to a new frontier line in Orenburg. The eldest son of Dmitri, Ivan Kravtsov granted with a lands in Vozdvizhenskaya Fortress on the lands of the Orenburg Cossack Host and owner of manor Gorbatovka in Balakhna uyezd of Nizhny Novgorod Governorate after 1829, that cost 23 000 gold rubles and a householder in Orenburg's Vorstadt.

== Notable members ==
- Alexander J. Kravtsov, (1893 - 1920) was a Russian Yesaul during the First World War and a Commander of the North Groupe of Orenburg Army in White movement during the Ataman Alexander Dutov's revolt against the Soviet authorities in Orenburg in 1918.
- Michail B. Dobryjan (1947 — 2013) (by his mother Maria F. Kravtsova) He was a Russian aerospace engineer and he served as director of the Russian Space Research Institute in Tarussa. He was one of the leading figures in the programs of the International Astrophysical observatory GRANAT and Vega program.
