= Kravtsov =

Origin
- Meaning: "tailor"
- Region of origin: Russia, Ukraine, Belarus

Kravtsov (Russian: Кравцов) is a Russian language surname of Western Slavic origin, krawc coming from the Polish krawiec/kravets, 'tailor' (the native Russian word for 'tailor' is portnoy). The German-language transcription commonly used in the past is Krawtzoff.

Notable people with the surname include:

== Politics ==
- Boris Kravtsov (born 1922), Russian jurist and politician
- Sergey Kravtsov (politician) (born 1974), Russian politician

== Sport ==
- Aleksandr Kravtsov (born 1974), Russian high jumper
- Elena Krawzow (born 1993), German Paralympic swimmer
- Denis Kravtsov (born 1990), Russian footballer
- Grzegorz Krawców (born 1962), Polish sprint canoer
- Igor Kravtsov (born 1973), Russian rower
- Maksim Kravtsov (born 2002), Belarusian footballer
- Pavlo Kravtsov (born 2000), Ukrainian footballer
- Sergey Mikhailovich Kravtsov (born 1960), Belarusian Olympic sailor
- Sergey Tarasovich Kravtsov (born 1948), Ukrainian Olympic cyclist
- Viacheslav Kravtsov (born 1987), Ukrainian basketball player
- Vladimir Kravtsov (1949–1999), Russian handball player
- Vitali Kravtsov (born 1999), Russian hockey player

== Military ==
- Colonel Alexander J. Kravtsov (1893–1920), military commander during Russian Civil War
- General Petr G. Kravtsov (1861–1919), Major General of the Don Army

== Other ==
- Kravtsov family (Orenburg), a noble family from Orenburg
- Major Natalya Meklin, née Kravtsova (1922–2005), was a much decorated World War II combat pilot in women-only air regiment of Night Witches
- Sergey Kravtsov (disambiguation), several people with this name

== See also ==
- 8812 Kravtsov, a main-belt asteroid
