= Historic Preservation Fund =

US National Park Service program

The Historic Preservation Fund (HPF) provides financial support for historic preservation projects throughout the United States. The fund is administered by the National Park Service (NPS), pursuant to the National Historic Preservation Act of 1966 (NHPA). The fund provides state historic preservation agencies with matching funds to implement the act.

== Background ==
Congress envisioned that the NHPA would provide a funding source for states with matching funds to implement the act. The act was to be implemented through partnerships with states, Indian Tribes, Native Hawaiians, local governments, nonprofit organizations, and the private sector. It brought forth state programs to implement much of the act; a National Register of Historic Places encompassing a wide range of sites and structures deemed historic; partnerships at all levels of government; incentives; assistance; and reviews. The NHPA endorsed the use of federal financial support for the national preservation program and called for two basic categories of assistance, both of which provide funding, rather than technical assistance, for historic preservation projects and to individuals for the preservation of properties listed in the National Register of Historic Places. Since enactment in 1966, repeated efforts to fund the HPF was realized after a 10-year campaign when consistent funding was authorized on September 28, 1976, through Public Law 94-422. The law amended the National Historic Preservation Act to establish a funding source known as the Historic Preservation Fund for a historic preservation grant program to provide assistance to non-federal entities.

== Source of funding ==
The Historic Preservation Fund is not funded through tax revenue. Rather, it is funded by royalties accumulated by the Office of Natural Resources Revenue through payments, rentals, bonuses, fines, penalties, and other revenue from the leasing and production of natural resources from federal and Indian lands onshore and in the Outer Continental Shelf. For example, in FY 2015, $9.87 billion in revenues were disbursed to seven funds: American Indian Tribes (8.6 percent), the Land and Water Conservation Fund (9 percent), Reclamation fund (14.1 percent), Historic Preservation Fund (1.5 percent or $150 million), State Share (18.6 percent), and the U.S. Treasury (48.1 percent). The legislation dedicates an allowable amount to these special funds, but their actual appropriation depends upon the annual congressional appropriations process. As a result, though legislation authorizes that these revenues go toward these funds, their actual appropriation for these purposes has seldom, if ever, occurred.

The fully authorized amount of $150 million, to be drawn from federal oil and gas proceeds, has never been appropriated for the intended purposes. The fund has made disbursements every year as far back as 1991, documented in available charts, yet half of the amount has never been allocated or appropriated to the intended programs. Rather than allocating the full amount or royalty revenues to the seven funds, these revenues stay in the U.S. Treasury and are, in effect, used in a 'bookkeeping exercise" to achieve annual appropriations spending levels. Over the years, the appropriated amount for the HPF has received over half of what has been authorized.

== Reauthorization history ==
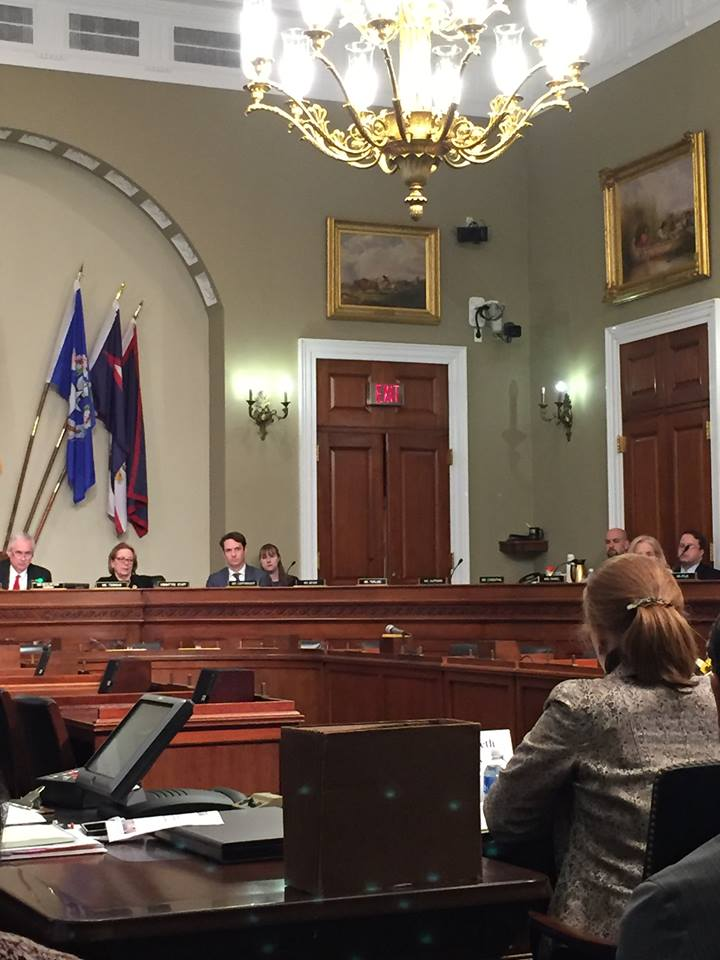
Elizabeth Hughes, President of the National Conference of State Historic Preservation Officers (NCSHPO) and SHPO for Maryland, testifying before the House Natural Resources Committee on February 11, 2016, on reauthorization of the U.S. Historic Preservation Fund.

The Historic Preservation Fund has been reauthorized six times since establishment in 1976 for periods between five and ten years.

- P.L. 94-422 (1976).
- P.L. 96-422, (Dec 12, 1980) for seven years as part of significant amendments to the National Historic Preservation Act.
- P.L 100-127 (Oct 9, 1987) for five years as a stand-alone piece of legislation.
- P.L. 102–575, Title XL (Oct 30, 1992) for five years as part of a larger Reclamation bill also known as the 1992 NHPA amendments.
- P.L. 106-208 (May 26, 2000) as a stand-alone piece of legislation reauthorizing the HPF for five years.
- P.L 109-453 (Dec 22, 2006) a stand-alone piece (in addition to ACHP amendments) for ten years that expired September 30, 2015.
- H.R. 2817 was introduced on June 17, 2015, by Representative Mike Turner. It became law on December 16, 2016, when President Obama signed H.R. 4680, the National Park Service Centennial Act, for a seven-year reauthorization through 2023 within P. L. 114–289.

== State Historic Preservation Officers ==
As part of NHPA, Section 101 implemented the designation of the State Historic Preservation Program. State Liaison Officers, which later became known as State Historic Preservation Officers (SHPOs), were established to manage historic preservation grants for the National Park Service. In the 1970s, these SHPOs experienced a growth in power as they became more organized, efficient and professional, and clarified their relationships with NPS. They also formed a National Conference of Historic Preservation Officers (NCSHPO) to represent them on a National level, particularly in Washington. The SHPO continued to gain an increasingly specific role, taking on the position of the advising consultant for the Section 106 review process. In 1980 with the amendment to the NHPA, the SHPO's exact duties were finally identified, defining its role, which remains today.

State historic preservation officers are appointed by their respective Governors and are a key component of implementing the national historic preservation program. SHPOs manage the annual HPF appropriation to perform the federal preservation responsibilities required by the NHPA and match what they receive by at least 40 percent. As established by the 1966 act, SHPOs administer federal programs at the state and local levels and also administer their own state historic preservation programs. These programs help communities identify, evaluate, preserve, and revitalize their historic, archeological, and cultural resources. SHPOs also work with federal agencies, state and local governments, the public and educational and not-for-profit organizations to raise historic preservation awareness and to instill in Americans a sense of pride in their unique history. This awareness builds communities, encourages heritage tourism and increases economic development, all of which is best accomplished at the state and local level.

The responsibilities of the State Historic Preservation Office, according to the National Historic Preservation Act of 1966, as amended, include running the State Historic Preservation Program and, as stated in the Act:

- (A) – In cooperation with Federal and State agencies, local governments, and private organizations and individuals, direct and conduct a comprehensive statewide survey of historic properties and maintain inventories of such properties;
- (B) – Identify and nominate eligible properties to the National Register and otherwise administer applications for listing historic properties on the National register;
- (C) – Prepare and implement a comprehensive statewide historic preservation plan;
- (D) – Administer the State program of Federal assistance for historic preservation within the State;
- (E) – Advise and assist, as appropriate, Federal and State agencies and local governments in carrying out their historic preservation responsibilities;
- (F) – Cooperate with the Secretary, the Advisory Council on Historic Preservation, and other Federal and State agencies, local governments, and organizations and individuals to ensure historic properties are taken into consideration at all levels of planning and development;
- (G) – Provide public information, education and training, and technical assistance relating to the Federal and State Historic Preservation Programs; and
- (H) – Cooperate with local governments in the development of the local historic preservation programs and assist local governments in becoming certified pursuant to subsection (C).

== Tribal Historic Preservation Officer ==
A Tribal Historic Preservation Officer (THPO) is a designated officer of a Native American Indian Tribe with responsibility for the administration of certain SHPO responsibilities, as authorized in 1992 pursuant to Section 101(d)(2), and listed in Section 101(b)(3) of the act for which the tribe has assumed by request to the Secretary of the Interior. A tribe submits its request to the National Park Service for processing which has administrative oversight of other NHPA programs as well. The THPO application process is detailed in a proposed rule, currently under final rule processing, codified in the Code of Federal Regulations at 36 CFR 61.8.
