= Smalt =

Blue pigment made with cobalt oxide

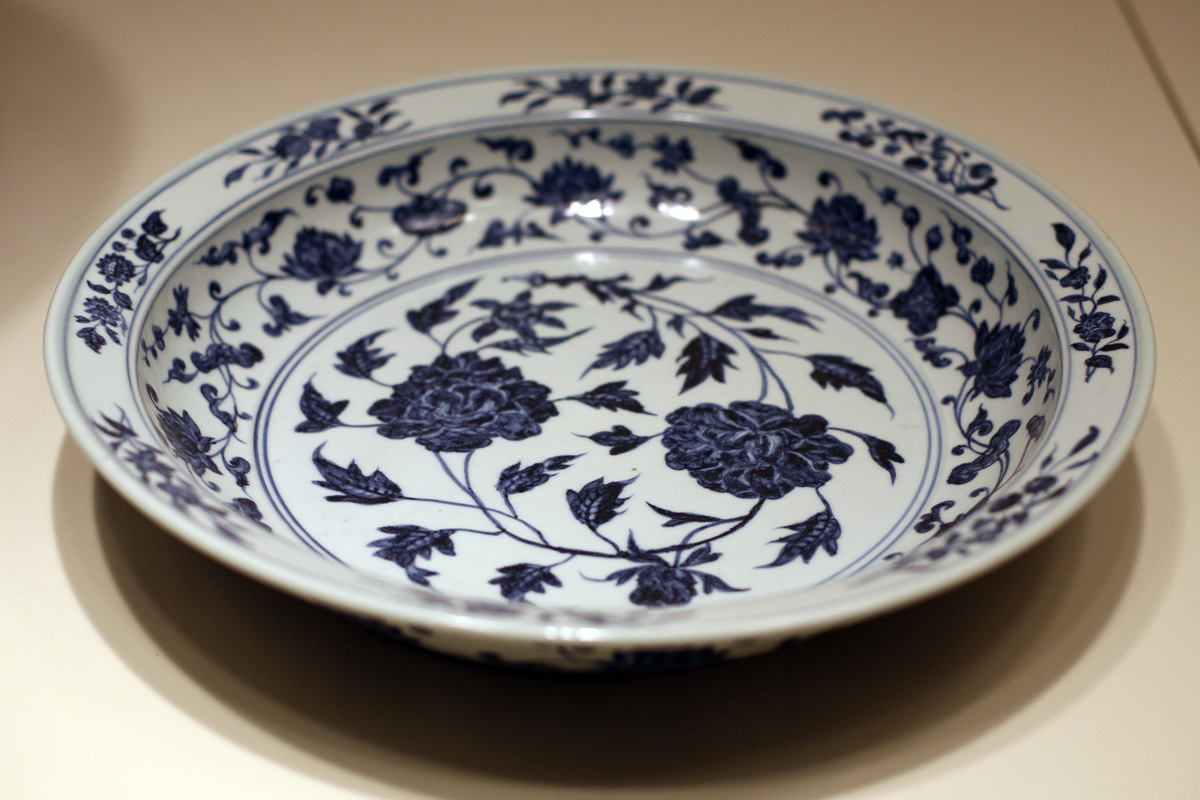
Ming dish, with smalt blue decoration

Smalt (also smalte, smalto, smaltino) is a finely ground potassium cobalt silicate glass used as a blue pigment in European painting from approximately the late fourteenth century to the mid-eighteenth century. Its colour ranges from deep violet-blue in coarse-ground, high-cobalt material to pale grey-blue in finely ground, lower-cobalt grades. Once one of the most commercially important blue pigments available to European painters, in oil painting smalt is now usually degraded in historical works, where it has frequently lost its original colour through chemical reaction with the oil paint medium, and is now rarely used.

However, it remains a viable pigment in watercolour painting, and is still used.

Smalt is a form of cobalt glass, but is distinct from other historic cobalt glasses (coloured window glass, glassware, enamels) in three respects: its cobalt content is deliberately very high (typically 2–14 wt% CoO, compared with fractions of a percent in tinted glass objects) to keep blue colouring power even in powdered form; it is specifically manufactured for reduction to a powder for use in paint; and its commercial value is defined by the behaviour of that powder in a paint medium rather than by the optical properties of the glass as a bulk object. These differences reflect a specific industrial purpose: the Blaufarbenwerke of the Ore Mountains, Bohemia, and the Netherlands that supplied European painters were not conventional glasshouses but a dedicated industry whose product was calibrated, graded, and traded as a pigment commodity.

== Names and terminology ==
"Smalt" and its cognates are the dominant terms in the European painting literature: French and English smalt; Italian smalto, smaltino, azzurro di smalto; German Schmalte, Schmelzblau; Dutch smalte, blauwsel; Spanish esmalte. The word derives from Medieval Latin smaltum (attested from the ninth century), itself from the same Germanic root as German schmelzen (to melt or smelt), reflecting the material's character as a fused glass product.

Before approximately 1540–1550, Italian smalto/smalti typically referred to enamel generically rather than specifically to the painting pigment. Unambiguous written use as a term for the painting pigment appears only from the mid-sixteenth century.

The intermediate product — roasted cobalt ore mixed with siliceous sand, traded commercially before glass fusion — is zaffre (Italian zaffera; German Safflor; Spanish zafrán de cobalto). Zaffre was a distinct commodity, used both to produce smalt and to colour ceramic glazes directly, and should not be confused with the finished glass pigment. The blue coloration of Chinese blue-and-white porcelain, Delftware, and Italian maiolica derives from zaffre or cobalt oxide applied as underglaze colorants, likely not from smalt in the sense of a ground glass pigment.

The term smaltino (Italian diminutive) originally designated a lighter-toned product rather than a distinct pigment type, and is not historically precise; the more accurate term in early modern Italian sources is azzurro di smalto.

== Composition and chemistry ==
Smalt is a silicate glass in which cobalt(II) ions (Co²⁺) occupy tetrahedral coordination sites within the potassium silicate network. The blue colour results from d–d electronic transitions of Co²⁺ in tetrahedral coordination; the same ion in octahedral coordination is pink to colourless — the structural basis of smalt's characteristic degradation in oil paint (§Degradation).

=== Typical composition ranges (smalt in paintings) ===
The following ranges are based on scanning electron microscopy / energy dispersive X-ray spectrometry (SEM-EDX) and laser ablation inductively coupled plasma mass spectrometry (LA-ICP-MS) analyses of smalt particles in cross-sections from European paintings, principally those reported by Mühlethaler and Thissen (1969/1993), Spring et al. (2005), Panighello et al. (2016), Van Loon et al. (2020), and Robinet et al. (2011).

Oxide	Typical range (wt%)	Role / notes
SiO₂	58–75	Glass network former
K₂O	7–21	Primary flux; source of leachable potassium (see §Degradation)
CoO	2–14 (typically 2–10 in paintings)	Colourant; ranges vary by grade and period (see note below)
Fe₂O₃	1–6, up to ~12	Trace element from ore; hue shifts toward greenish above ~12 wt% when combined with high CoO
As₂O₃	0.5–8	Partially retained from ore roasting; provenance marker
NiO	0.1–1	Consistently present in Central European (Erzgebirge) smalt
Bi₂O₃	0.05–2	Consistently present in Central European smalt
Na₂O	usually <2	Minor; dominant only in rare soda glass smalt
CaO	usually <5	Minor; may affect degradation rate (debated)

Notes on CoO content: (1) The ranges above reflect smalt in painting contexts. CoO values measured by WD-XRF at Central European production sites (Bohemian kilns, 16th–17th century) run considerably lower: 0.23–3.64 wt% in excavated fragments from Soví huť and Horní Blatná. Whether this difference reflects method calibration, sampling of waste or lower-grade glass, or a genuine compositional distinction between production-site and commercial-grade material remains unresolved. (2) CoO values in sixteenth-century paintings typically fall in the 5–10 wt% range; seventeenth-century paintings more often 2–5 wt%. This apparent decline has been noted in the analytical literature but its cause — changes in ore quality, grade selection, or production practice — is not established.

The simultaneous presence of Co, Ni, Bi, and As is diagnostic for smalt of Central European (Erzgebirge) origin. Trace element ratios, particularly the ratios CoO:NiO:As₂O₃:Bi₂O₃, have been used as provenance fingerprints to distinguish ore sources: a Group 2 (Co-Ni) signature is associated with earlier Italian and Venetian supply; a Group 3 (Co-As-Ni-Bi) signature with central European / Erzgebirge supply, which dominates in European paintings from the mid-sixteenth century onwards.

Italian and Venetian smalt of the early to mid-fifteenth century is sometimes characterised instead by elevated Cu, Pb, and Sn with minimal As and Bi, reflecting a different glassmaking tradition consistent with Venetian soda glass and enamel production, rather than Central European supply.

== Production ==
=== Documentation and its limits ===
The production of smalt is significantly better documented for the late industrial period (late seventeenth to nineteenth century) than for the earlier period of its greatest artistic use (fifteenth to seventeenth century). The main primary sources for the industrial process are: Kunckel's Ars Vitraria Experimentalis (1679), the first partial published account; Kapff (1792), the most comprehensive published description of the full process; Baron d'Holbach's article in the Encyclopédie (mid-eighteenth century); and an internal production catechism from the Westzaan mill "De Blauwe Hengst" (c. 1760–1780), surviving in a company history published by Jantzen (1951). The deliberate industrial secrecy of the Blaufarbenwerke meant the process was not publicly described before the early eighteenth century.

For the earlier period, when smalt first appeared in European painting (c. 1400) and during its rise to widespread use (fifteenth and sixteenth centuries), the production process is inferred from:

- Recipe manuscripts from the late fourteenth to seventeenth centuries, which preserve workshop-scale formulas for cobalt glass intended for mosaic, fresco, or ceramic use; these are discussed in §Early workshop recipes below.
- Archaeological evidence from excavated production sites in Bohemia, dated to the first half of the sixteenth century onwards.
- Trade documentation establishing the flow of raw cobalt materials (zaffre, cobalt ore) between the Central European and Western European markets.

No recipe specifically for preparing smalt for use as a painting pigment in oil from raw ore has thus far been identified in any pre-industrial written source. Painters' treatises that mention smalt treat it as a commercial product purchased from specialist suppliers (apothecaries, spice traders, colour dealers), not as something made in the workshop.

=== The industrial two-stage process ===
The following description reflects the process as documented from the late seventeenth century onwards, primarily from Kapff (1792) and d'Holbach, as synthesised by Seccaroni and Haldi (2016, Ch. 8). Whether and to what extent this process applies to smalt production before c. 1600 is not fully established.

==== Stage 1: Ore roasting and zaffre production ====
Cobalt ores from the Ore Mountains (principally skutterudite, safflorite, cobaltite, and erythrite) are geochemically associated with arsenic, nickel, bismuth, and iron. Before roasting, bismuth was recovered by liquation: the ore charge was heated to approximately 270 °C, at which temperature bismuth alloys (Wismuthgraupen) melted and could be tapped off. Bismuth was commercially valuable for printing-type alloys (from the mid-fifteenth century onwards), and its profitable extraction had made Ore Mountains mine development economically viable before cobalt's own value was recognised.

The ore was then dry-ground and roasted in a direct-flame kiln (Flammofen) for 3–9 hours. Arsenic trioxide volatilised and was partially captured in the chimney flue. Crucially, the roasting was not designed for complete arsenic elimination: the cobalt-rich arsenic fraction from the nearest chimney section was recycled into subsequent ore batches, while the distal fraction was sold commercially as arsenic trioxide. Retained arsenic reportedly improved the colour and gloss of the final glass, and is consistently present in Erzgebirge smalt as a consequence of deliberate production practice rather than incomplete processing. The cooled residue, a cobalt oxide mass, was ground with quartz flour to yield zaffre, the traded intermediate.

==== Stage 2: Glass fusion and grade separation ====
Zaffre was mixed with fine calcined sand and potash (potassium carbonate, from wood ash) in proportions determined by preliminary assay of each ore batch. The mixture was fused in a glass furnace for approximately 8 hours with continuous stirring, producing an intensely coloured Kobaltglas. The molten glass was quenched in cold water, fracturing it into a friable frit.

The crucible residue, Kobaltspeise (speiss), an aluminosilicate by-product enriched in nickel and bismuth, was discarded. This empirical separation explains why commercial smalt glass is relatively depleted in Ni and Bi compared to the raw ore.

The frit was then ground (initially dry, then wet) and placed in water-filled separation barrels with taps at different heights. Gravitational flotation simultaneously separated the frit into commercial grades: coarser particles settled faster; finer particles remained in suspension longer. After washing to remove surplus potash, drying, and re-grinding, the product was sold in distinct commercial grades (§Commercial grades).

==== Early workshop recipes ====
Several recipe manuscripts preserve workshop-scale methods for producing cobalt-coloured glass that provide evidence for earlier, pre-industrial production practice, though none documents the full industrial process.

The earliest known written recipe for a cobalt glass prepared for painting appears in an anonymous Florentine manuscript of the late fourteenth or early fifteenth century (published by Milanesi, 1864). The recipe calls for equal weights of crystal glass and sale di tartero (potassium carbonate from wine tartar), fused together and then coloured with azzurro da vetro (cobalt glass or zaffre?); the resulting coloured glass is then quenched, ground, and washed with lye. Seccaroni and Haldi (2016) note that the final lye-washing step, while described as improving colour, is chemically counterproductive as it induces surface devitrification of the glass grains. This recipe is explicitly a mosaic and glass-arts text (the treatise is titled Dell'Arte del vetro per musaico), and its relationship to the painting pigment smalt is uncertain.

A Ferrarese recipe book of the fifteenth century (associated with the Pseudo-Savonarola manuscript tradition) preserves the earliest known written description of intentional particle-size grading of smalt for painting use: smalt is ground with milk, washed in successive water baths, and settled to yield "three sorts, one more beautiful than the other." This is a preparation method for already-made commercial smalt, not a production recipe.

Workshop-scale smalt production recipes from Venetian recipe books of the seventeenth century (Darduin manuscript, late seventeenth century; Brunoro, 1644) specify high zaffre:glass ratios suitable for smalto da muro (fresco smalt), reflecting the different requirements of pigment for fresco as against oil painting. No comparable recipe for oil-painting smalt has been identified.

=== Historical production sites ===
Archaeological excavation has confirmed smalt production at several Central European sites:

Region	Sites	Active period	Notes
Saxony, Germany	Schneeberg, Annaberg, Johanngeorgenstadt; Blaufarbenwerk Zschopenthal	c. 1500–19th century	Saxon Electoral monopoly from 1575; the politically dominant supply chain to the Netherlands
Bohemia	Soví huť (Eulenhütte, Neudeck), Horní Blatná (Bergstadt Platten)	First half 16th century–17th century	Confirmed archaeometrically by Zlámalová Cílová et al. (2020); associated with the Schürer glassmaking family
Netherlands	Amsterdam area, Zaandam (blauwselmolens)	c. 1550 onwards; dominant from c. 1600	Re-grinding and blending of Saxon raw glass into finished commercial grades; "De Blauwe Hengst" (Westzaan, est. 1701) documented in detail by Jantzen (1951)
Norway	Blaafarveværket (BCW), Modum	c. 1780s–1890s	Largest world producer 1823–1849; ore from the Skuterud mines; well-documented archive

== History ==
=== Early antecedents ===
Cobalt-coloured glass has been produced since antiquity, and ancient cobalt glass pigments (particularly those of Egyptian, Islamic, and Byzantine origin) are sometimes described as "smalt" in older literature. The term is imprecise in these contexts: the defining features of smalt as a European painting pigment (potassium flux, deliberately maximised cobalt content, industrial-scale grinding and grading) are not documented in ancient or medieval traditions. Analytically confirmed cobalt glass pigment comparable to Early Modern smalt in composition has been identified in thirteenth-century Byzantine illuminated manuscripts and wall paintings, demonstrating that high-cobalt glass was occasionally used as a painting material before the Ore Mountains supply network emerged, but the relationship between these earlier materials and Early Modern European smalt is one of general material continuity rather than direct technological descent.

=== European painting, c. 1400–1550 ===
The oldest analytically confirmed smalt in European easel painting is in an anonymous German (possibly Swabian) panel painting of approximately 1400, identified by micro-X-ray fluorescence (μXRF). A survey of approximately thirty confirmed pre-1550 occurrences from Italian, German, and Netherlandish works documents smalt's presence across Europe well before the mid-sixteenth century commercial expansion.

In early to mid-fifteenth century Italian and Venetian painting, smalt sometimes exhibits a compositional signature distinct from Central European supply, with elevated Cu, Pb, and Sn with minimal As and Bi, consistent with production by Venetian or Muranese glassmakers. This Venetian-type smalt appears to have been displaced by the German product as Erzgebirge supply intensified.

The received narrative in older smalt literature credits the Bohemian glassmaker Christoph Schürer with "inventing" smalt as a painting pigment around 1540–1560. Modern analytical and archival evidence does not support this claim: smalt predates Schürer by at least a century in European painting, and the "Schürer" narrative is traceable to Saxon administrative tradition of the seventeenth century, which promoted Bohemian-Saxon priority in the cobalt trade for commercial and political reasons. The Schürer documentary record also conflates multiple individuals from at least two generations of the Schürer family, active at different sites in Bohemia and Saxony.

=== Peak period, c. 1550–1700 ===
Smalt use in European painting increased sharply from the mid-sixteenth century as Bohemian and Saxon Blaufarbenwerke expanded production. By 1549, Biondo (Venice) described "Flemish smalt" (smalto di Fiandra) as the finest available; Lomazzo (Milan, 1584) confirmed the same reputation, associating it with the workshop of Bernard Swerts/Schwarz at Antwerp. After the fall of Antwerp to Spanish forces in 1585, the Dutch merchant network inherited the trade. Amsterdam became the dominant distribution centre and the Zaandam blauwselmolens the standard commercial refiners, re-grinding and blending Saxon raw glass into the finished grades demanded by the painting trade.

A large purchase of smalt for the decoration of the gallery of Francis I of France at Fontainebleau is documented in 1536.

Smalt has been identified analytically in paintings from across Northern Europe (Germany, the Netherlands, Flanders, Britain, Scandinavia), Spain, New Spain (Mexico), the Italian peninsula, the Balkans, and Greece. From the late seventeenth century it is documented in South Asian and Iranian paintings and in early Qing dynasty Chinese paintings, and in Edo period Japanese works, reflecting the reach of the European cobalt trade.

=== Decline and supersession ===
Smalt was gradually displaced from the early eighteenth century by Prussian blue (ferric ferrocyanide), which offered stronger colouring power and greater stability in oil paint. The transition was gradual — smalt continued to be purchased commercially in the Netherlands into the early nineteenth century — but by approximately 1750 it was rarely the primary blue pigment in European painting. Manufactured artificial ultramarine (from 1828) completed the displacement for most applications. In the Dutch household and textile trade, smalt (blauwsel, used as a whitening additive in laundry) remained in use longer, but this application is outside the scope of this article.

== Commercial grades ==
The flotation separation step in production naturally separated the frit into grades by particle size, and these grades also differed in cobalt content. A key finding from modern analytical study is that the commercial grade system classified smalt primarily by cobalt content (CoO wt%), not by particle size alone. Particle size distributions measured from cross-sections of historical paintings therefore do not directly identify the original commercial grade.

The fully documented grade system dates to the eighteenth century and is best attested in the Saxon Blaufarbenwerk documentation and in Kapff (1792), as synthesised by Seccaroni and Haldi (2016, Ch. 8). Earlier grade vocabulary is attested in recipe books and trade documents from the late fifteenth century onwards (e.g. the 1594 Venetian colour-merchant inventory of Jacopo de' Benedetti, which distinguishes smalto chiaro, smalto mezan, and smalto scuro), but these earlier terms do not map directly onto the later formal grade hierarchy.

Grade	German	French	Character
Finest	Sumpfeschel	Azur fin	Finest particles; palest colour; sometimes recycled if too fine for commercial use
Fine	Fasseschel (Eschel)	Eschel	Fine; pale blue; valued for its drying (siccative) effect in glazes
Medium	Couleur	Couleur	Standard commercial painting grade
Coarse	Streublau	Haute-couleur	Coarsest; deepest blue; strongest colour saturation

A parallel Spanish vocabulary is attested from the early eighteenth century: esmalte fino (fine), esmalte grosso (coarse), and esmalte remolido (re-ground, deliberately finer), documented by Palomino (1715) and confirmed analytically in New Spain paintings.

== Optical and physical properties ==
Smalt particles are angular, isotropic glass fragments. Their optical behaviour in paint is unusual:

- Low refractive index: smalt's refractive index is close to that of linseed oil (~1.5), making particles nearly invisible in the oil medium when undried. Colour is carried almost entirely by light scattered and absorbed at particle surfaces, not by bulk transmission, giving smalt intrinsically weaker colouring power per unit weight than most inorganic pigments.
- Particle size governs saturation: coarser particles produce a deeper, more saturated blue; finer particles appear paler. This relationship was known empirically to early modern practitioners. The earliest written attestation of intentional particle-size grading of smalt is in the fifteenth-century Pseudo-Savonarola recipe (§Early workshop recipes). This has not yet been shown systematically in an analytical study, yet.
- Translucency: smalt particles are translucent rather than opaque (unlike azurite), producing depth in thick applications and making smalt effective in glazes and mixed layers.
- UV/IR behaviour: intact smalt typically appears bright in ultraviolet reflectance photography and dark in infrared reflectography — a combination useful for preliminary location in paintings examination. Severely degraded smalt loses UV fluorescence.

== Behaviour in oil paint ==
=== Siccative properties ===
Smalt accelerates the drying of linseed oil and other drying oils, functioning as a siccative (drying accelerator). This property was known and exploited by early modern painters. The French workshop manual BnF Ms.Fr.640 (c. 1585) recommends impalpable grinding specifically for the drying effect in lake glazes; Theodore de Mayerne (c. 1620) notes rapid surface drying of smalt-containing paint.

The mechanism of the siccative effect is contested in modern literature:

- Cobalt mechanism: Co²⁺ released from the glass surface catalyses oil oxidation via a radical chain reaction (the Haber–Weiss cycle), acting as a surface drier — accelerating drying at the air–paint interface but not promoting through-curing.
- Glass matrix mechanism: dissolution of the glass (releasing K⁺ and other ions) may provide an additional siccative pathway independent of cobalt content, as demonstrated for colourless crystallin glass in a red lake system.

Both mechanisms may operate simultaneously; their relative contributions are not resolved. An important complication is that K⁺ released from the glass has been shown experimentally to retard the oil autoxidation chain at ambient temperatures, potentially outweighing the cobalt-driven acceleration in paint films at room temperature. Smalt alone in oil forms only a surface skin without through-curing; full through-drying in smalt-containing paint requires the presence of lead white or another through-drier.

=== Interaction with lead white ===
The combination of smalt with lead white (basic lead carbonate, 2PbCO₃·Pb(OH)₂) has well-documented effects in oil paint:

- Through-drying: smalt and lead white together produce thoroughly dried paint films; smalt alone does not.
- Degradation protection: smalt particles in lead-white-rich layers are better preserved than those in lead-white-poor layers. The proposed mechanism is that lead soap formation in the aged paint film sequesters free fatty acids that would otherwise promote potassium leaching from the glass.

== Degradation ==
Smalt is notorious in the conservation literature for its tendency to lose its blue colour in oil paint. The problem was likely recognised by early modern practitioners – Armenini (1586), Van Mander (1603), and de Mayerne (c. 1620) all comment on it — and attributed by them to yellowing of the oil medium. Modern analysis has established a different primary mechanism.

=== Potassium depletion and colour loss ===
The primary cause of discolouration is potassium leaching: K⁺ ions from the potassium silicate glass matrix are exchanged for H⁺ (from free fatty acids produced during oil ageing) in an ion exchange reaction. As K⁺ is progressively removed, the charge-compensating environment around Co²⁺ ions collapses. Co²⁺ shifts from tetrahedral coordination (which produces the blue colour) to octahedral coordination (colourless to grey-brown). This coordination shift has been directly confirmed by synchrotron micro-X-ray absorption spectroscopy (μXAS) applied to smalt particles from paintings at multiple stages of degradation. Simultaneously, the silicate network undergoes structural polymerisation, forming silanol groups and progressively resembling vitreous silica in spectral character.

The cobalt does not migrate under normal degradation conditions — it is the removal of potassium around the cobalt that causes colour loss. This was first demonstrated directly by time-of-flight secondary ion mass spectrometry (TOF-SIMS) imaging of smalt particle cross-sections from sixteenth-century Netherlandish paintings: progressive K:Co depletion gradients, from particle rim to core, were mapped at submicron resolution; particles with K:Co ratios below approximately 1:1 were consistently discoloured.

A secondary mechanism operates through the oil medium: alkaline K⁺ released from the glass catalyses isomerisation of fatty acid double bonds, extending conjugated systems into the visible wavelength range and producing characteristic brown discolouration of the surrounding paint film, independent of any structural change in the smalt particles themselves.

Historical writers were not entirely wrong in attributing smalt's colour problems to the oil medium: this K-driven oil discolouration is a genuine second pathway, distinct from the structural change in the glass itself. The two mechanisms co-occur in aged paintings.

=== Factors affecting degradation rate ===
- Particle size: finer particles, having a higher surface-area-to-volume ratio, degrade faster.
- Lead white: smalt in lead-white-rich paint layers is better preserved (§above).
- Soda glass: rare Na-dominant smalt (documented in Romanino's Nativity, c. 1524–6, National Gallery, London) appears substantially more resistant to degradation than potash smalt, possibly because sodium-silicate bonds are stronger at these compositions.
- Calcium: elevated CaO in the glass or in the surrounding paint matrix may retard K leaching; the evidence is present but not conclusive.

== Analytical identification ==
Smalt in historical paintings is identified by a combination of methods. No single method is definitive; convergent evidence from multiple techniques is standard practice.

Method	Primary signal	Notes
Optical microscopy (cross-section)	Angular, isotropic glass particles; blue to grey	Principal screening method; degraded particles appear pale or grey
SEM-EDX	Co, Ni, Bi, As co-occurrence; K₂O 7–14 wt% in fresh glass	Principal quantitative method; the basis of published compositional databases
μXRF / MA-XRF	Elemental maps: Co, Ni, Bi	Non-invasive; used for whole-painting or area survey before sampling
LA-ICP-MS	Major and trace element mapping at 5 µm resolution	Enables cobalt ore provenance fingerprinting; single-particle analysis
TOF-SIMS	K:Co ratio mapping within individual particles	Sub-micron resolution; diagnosis of degradation state
Raman spectroscopy	Cobalt glass Raman spectrum; crust phases (arcanite, palmierite)	Surface analysis; identification of secondary degradation mineral phases
FTIR	Potassium soap bands (~1560, 1404 cm⁻¹)	Detects degradation products; fresh smalt produces no distinctive FTIR bands
UV reflectance / IR imaging	UV bright; IR dark	Non-invasive preliminary survey

The co-occurrence of Ni and Bi alongside Co is diagnostic for Central European (Erzgebirge) smalt. Their absence, combined with elevated Cu, Pb, and Sn, may indicate Venetian or Italian production.

== See also ==
- Cobalt blue
- Painting conservation
- Zaffre
