= Reclaimed (radio show) =

Canadian radio program

Reclaimed is a Canadian radio program, which airs Wednesday evenings on CBC Music and is repeated the following Sunday evening on CBC Radio One. Hosted by Jarrett Martineau, the program airs music by indigenous musicians from Canada and the world.

The program premiered as a short-run summer series in 2017, before returning to the network's permanent regular-season schedule in November.

== See also ==
- Reclaimed (disambiguation)
