= Stay Asleep =

Studio album by Bigwig
- Released: March 16, 1999
- Recorded: November–December 1998
- Genre: Punk rock, pop punk, melodic hardcore, skate punk
- Length: 33:22
- Label: Kung Fu Records

Bigwig chronology
UnMerry Melodies (1997)	Stay Asleep (1999)	An Invitation to Tragedy (2001)

Professional ratings
Review scores
Source	Rating
Allmusic	2/5 stars
Punknews	4.5/5 stars

Stay Asleep is the second studio album by American punk band Bigwig. It was released on March 16, 1999.

== Track listing ==
No.	Title	Length
1.	"Still"	2:06
2.	"Dent"	2:39
3.	"Smile"	3:22
4.	"Flavor Ice"	2:05
5.	"Freegan"	0:34
6.	"Falling Down"	2:39
7.	"Friends"	3:17
8.	"Numbers"	1:59
9.	"Sellout"	2:28
10.	"Jerk"	2:14
11.	"13"	2:43
12.	"Stand Up"	3:00
13.	"Boardumb"	2:41
14.	"1-800-Whipped"	2:59

"Freegan" was later released on the compilation album, Short Music for Short People.
