= UnMerry Melodies =

Studio album by Bigwig
- Released: April 30, 1997
- Genre: Punk rock, pop punk, melodic hardcore, skate punk
- Length: 30:31
- Label: Fearless

Bigwig chronology
Self-titled 7" (1996)	UnMerry Melodies (1997)	Stay Asleep (1999)

Professional ratings
Review scores
Source	Rating
Punknews	3.5/5 stars

UnMerry Melodies is the first studio album by American punk rock band Bigwig. It was released on Fearless Records in 1997.

== Track list ==
No.	Title	Length
1.	"Old Lady"	3:00
2.	"Best of Me"	2:28
3.	"Drunken Knight"	2:59
4.	"Cheers"	1:54
5.	"Pro-Life Taker"	2:14
6.	"My So Called Friend"	2:56
7.	"Stops"	2:36
8.	"Your in Sample"	1:23
9.	"Bad Timing"	2:49
10.	"Dylan's Song"	1:40
11.	"Carnivore"	2:35
12.	"The Girl in the Green Jacket"	2:47
13.	"Untitled"	1:10
