= Bigwig (band) =

American punk band

- Origin: New Jersey, U.S.
- Genres: Hardcore punk; melodic hardcore; punk rock; skate punk
- Years active: 1995-present
- Labels: Kung Fu; Fearless; Fueled by Ramen

Bigwig is an American punk rock band from New Jersey, formed in 1995. They were originally composed of Josh Farrell (guitar), John Castaldo (bass), Tom Petta (guitar/vocals), and Dan Rominski (drums). The band has seen numerous lineup changes over the years, with Tom Petta being the only constant member. These changes brought a variety of influences and styles, contributing to the band’s evolving sound. Bigwig's music often tackles political and social issues, including themes of anti-establishment and personal struggle.

The band Bigwig derived their name from a character in the 1978 animated film "Watership Down," which is based on Richard Adams' novel. In the story, Bigwig is a strong and fearless rabbit leader. This film was a childhood favorite of the band's singer, Tom Petta, and it introduced him to themes of leadership and politics at a young age. The character left such a significant impression on him that he chose to name the band after Bigwig.

Bigwig have performed with such bands as Pennywise, Less Than Jake, Blink-182, The Ataris, The Vandals, New Found Glory, No Use for a Name, NOFX, The Suicide Machines, Agnostic Front, Lagwagon, and Reel Big Fish. Following the release of their 2001 album Invitation To Tragedy, both Josh Farrell and Tom Petta have received producers credits on several well known albums. Tom Petta has most recently produced the new record entitled For Heaven's Sake by Canadian punk rock band Only Way Back.

Their latest album, Reclamation, was released on February 7, 2006, by Fearless Records.

In June 2014, Bigwig performed at Canada's Amnesia Rockfest in Montebello, Quebec and also in September at East Coast Tsunami Fest, Reading, PA.

== Members ==
- Tom Petta (Guitar/vocals)
- Zach Lorinc (Bass)
- Paul Carney (Guitar)
- Rob Ferreira (Drums)

== Discography ==
Studio albums

- UnMerry Melodies (1997)
- Stay Asleep (1999)
- An Invitation to Tragedy (2001)
- Reclamation (2006)

Incomplete list of compilations

- Punk Goes Metal (Fearless Records)
- The Mongolian Wild Turkey...Vol. 4 (Bad Stain Records)
- Punk til ya Pass Out (Bad Stain Records)
- Bad Scene, Everyone's Fault: Jawbreaker Tribute (Dying Wish Records)
- Short Music For Short People (Fat Wreck Chords)
- Punk Chunks
- Anarchy in the N.J. (Umbilical Records)
