= Junker (Russia) =

Term with several meanings in Imperial Russia

Yunker - rank insignia 1874-1903
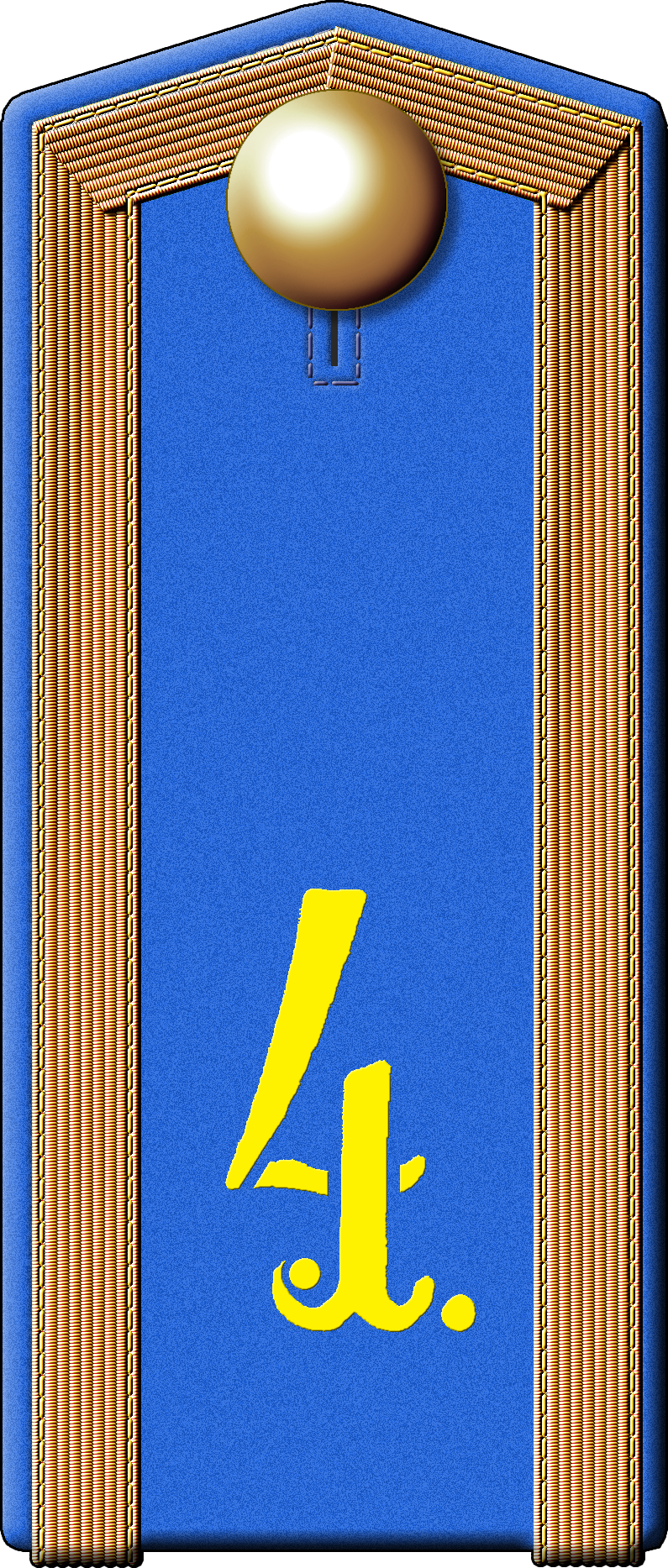
shoulder board
- Shlisselburgsky 15th Infantry regiment
- Ladozhsky 16th Infantry regiment

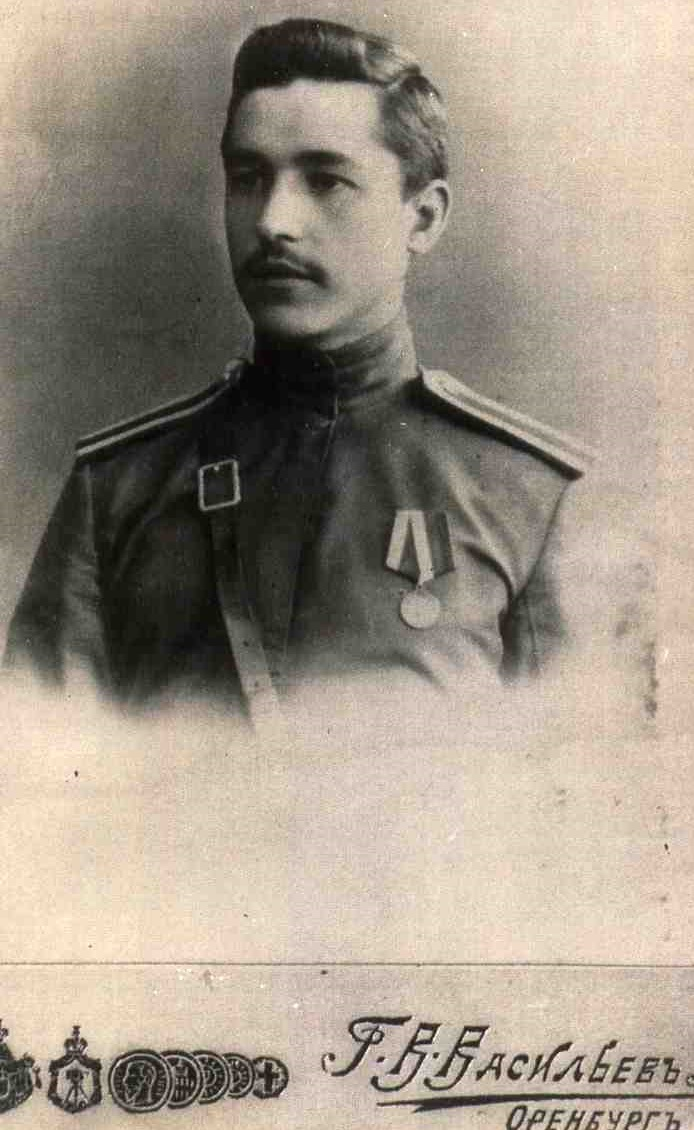
Yunker Kravtsov (1914)

The term Junker (Russian: юнкер (yunker)) had several meanings in Imperial Russia. The Russian substantive Yunker is derived from the German noun Junker, where it means "young lord".

- Yunker (ru: юнкер) was the rank for a volunteer at military service (ru: вольноопределяющийся, volnoopredelyayushchiycya, de: One-year volunteer) in the Imperial Russian Army in 19th and 20th centuries.
  - Fanen-yunker/yunker (ru: фанен-юнкер/юнкер) was a military rank for junior officers of dvoryan descent since 1902.
- Kamer-yunker (ru: камер-юнкер; cf. German Kammerjunker) was a courtier title defined in the Table of Ranks, generally equating to valet de chambre or Groom of the Chamber.
- Yunker was a term for students of any military or junker school in between 1864 and 1917.

== Junker schools ==
Junker schools in Russia were first introduced in 1864. They were usually located next to district headquarters in a given region. Junker schools prepared low-rank military for officer rank. In 1900, the Russian government established junker infantry schools in Moscow and Kiev, and in 1902, a junker cavalry school in Yelizavetgrad. In 1901, the government transformed all former district junker schools into seven infantry schools (St. Petersburg, Vilna, Tiflis, Odessa, Kazan, Chuguyev, Irkutsk), one cavalry school (Tver) and three Cossack schools (Novocherkassk, Stavropol, Orenburg).

Every junker school had a three-year program. In order to enroll into a junker school, a student had to attend a gymnasium or cadet corps for six years or pass a corresponding exam.

== See also ==
- Junker
- Cadet Corps (Russia)
- Junker mutiny
