= An Invitation to Tragedy =

Studio album by Bigwig
- Released: September 18, 2001
- Genre: Punk rock, pop punk, melodic hardcore, skate punk
- Length: 32:56
- Label: Fearless
- Producer: Michael Wooding

Bigwig chronology
| Stay Asleep (1999) | An Invitation to Tragedy (2001) | Reclamation (2006) |

Professional ratings
Review scores
| Source | Rating |
|---|---|
| Allmusic | 2/5 stars |
| Punknews | 4/5 stars |

An Invitation to Tragedy is the third studio album by American punk rock band Bigwig. It was released on Fearless Records in 2001.

== Track list ==
| No. | Title | Length |
|---|---|---|
| 1. | "Waste" | 1:30 |
| 2. | "Sink or Swim" | 2:45 |
| 3. | "Sore Losers" | 2:17 |
| 4. | "Moosh" | 2:40 |
| 5. | "Thinning the Herd" | 2:45 |
| 6. | "Mr. Asshole" | 2:15 |
| 7. | "Blinded" | 2:25 |
| 8. | "Hope" | 2:42 |
| 9. | "Counting Down" | 3:10 |
| 10. | "Alone in New Jersey" | 3:05 |
| 11. | "Appreciation" | 1:13 |
| 12. | "Who Am I to Say" | 2:41 |
| 13. | "Static" | 3:28 |
