= Alexander J. Kravtsov =

Imperial Russian Army commander (1893–1920)

Kravtsov J. Alexander
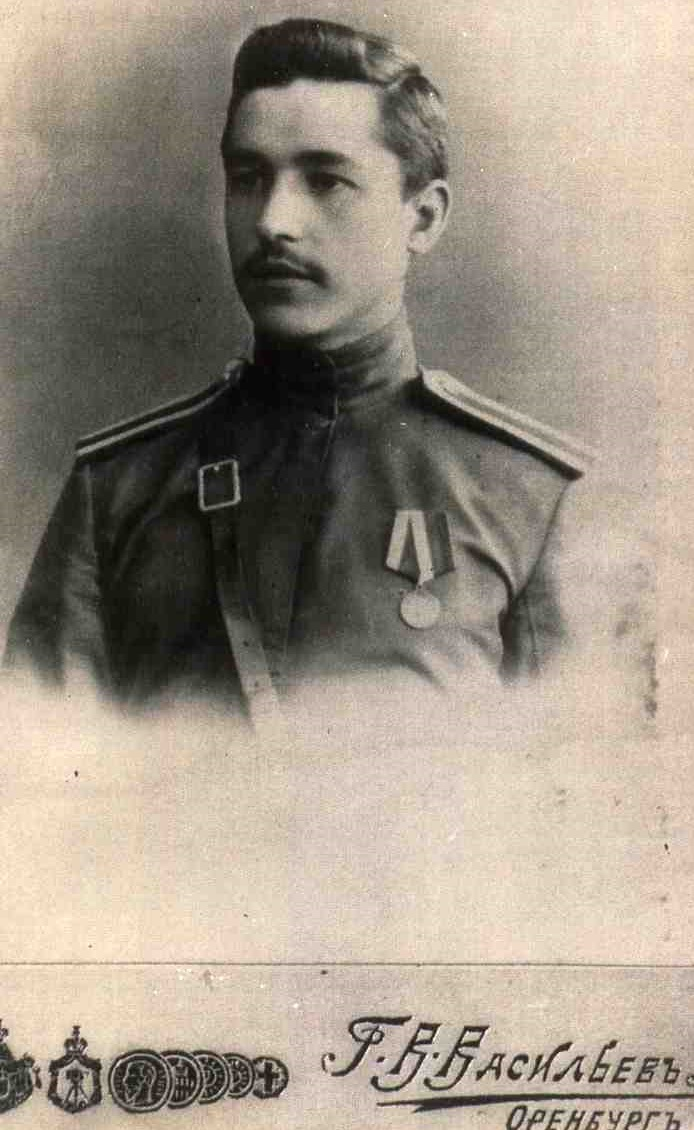
- Junker A.Y. Kraftsov
- Born: October 11, 1893 settlement Vozdvízhenskaya
- Died: January 12, 1920 (aged 26)
- Military career
- Allegiance: Russian Empire
- Branch: (Russian Empire) Imperial Russian Army, Orenburg Cossacks Army
- Rank: Yesaul
- Commands: 1st military okrug of the Orenburg Cossacks Army
- Conflicts: World War I: Eastern Front; Brusilov Offensive; Civil War in Russia: Aleksandr Kolchaks offensive
- Awards: Order of St. Anna of 4th degree for bravery Order of St. Anna of 2nd degree Order of St. Anna of 3rd degree Order of Saint Stanislaus of 3rd degree Order of Saint Stanislaus of 2nd degree Order of St. Vladimir of 4th degree * Golden St. George weapons "For bravery"

Alexander J. Kravtsov (Russian: Алекса́ндр Я́ковлевич Кравцов [Aleksandr Yakovlevich Kravtsov], October 11, 1893 – 1920) was a Russian Imperial Army Yesaul during the First World War and a Commander of the Northern Group of the Orenburg Independent Army in the White movement during the Ataman Alexander Dutovs revolt against the Soviet authorities in Orenburg in 1918. He was also one of the Orenburg Army officers who participated in the march across the Turgaj steppe.

== Background and early life ==
Alexander Kravtsov was born in a settlement Vozdvízhenskaya, in a noble family of Kravtsov on October 11, 1893, son of cavalry officer Jacob S. Kravtsov and his wife Marie. In 1914, Kravtsov graduated from Orenburg Military School for the 1st Class and later served in the 14th Orenburg Cossacks Regiment.

== Military career ==
Yesaul Kravtsov received the Gold Sword for Bravery during World War I on the Eastern Front for personal bravery on the battlefield in 1915. After the revolution and the collapse of the front, Alexander Kravtsov returned home. Like most of the Cossacks, he was an outspoken opponent of the Bolsheviks and took the first opportunity to form and join a partisan band. This group was under the command of the North Army Group of the Orenburg Army during the Ataman Alexander Dutovs revolt against the Soviet authorities in Orenburg in 1918. Kravtsov was appointed Assistant Commandant of Orenburg Army HQ (November 1918). He was seriously wounded during the Battle for Orsk on July 29, 1918.

== Awards and decorations ==
Russian Empire awards and decorations
| Order of Saint Vladimir, 4th Class, 1916 |
| Order of Saint Anna, 2nd Class, 1914 |
| Order of Saint Anna, 3rd Class, 1914 |
| Order of Saint Anna, 4th Class, 1914 |
| Order of Saint Stanislaus, 2nd Class, 1916 |
| Order of Saint Stanislaus, 3rd Class, 1915 |
| Gold Saint George Sword for Bravery, 1915 |

== See also ==
- White movement
- Alexander Dutov
- Russian Civil War
