= Reclaimer (disambiguation) =

A reclaimer is a machine used in bulk material handling applications.

Reclaimer may also refer to:

- Reclaimer (Halo), a title in the video game series Halo
- USS Reclaimer (ARS-42), a salvage ship in the United States Navy
- Reclaimer (album), a 2017 album by Shadow of Intent

== See also ==
- Reclaim (disambiguation)
