= Mikhail Dobriyan =

Soviet and Russian aerospace engineer (1947–2013)

Mikhail Borisovich Dobriyan
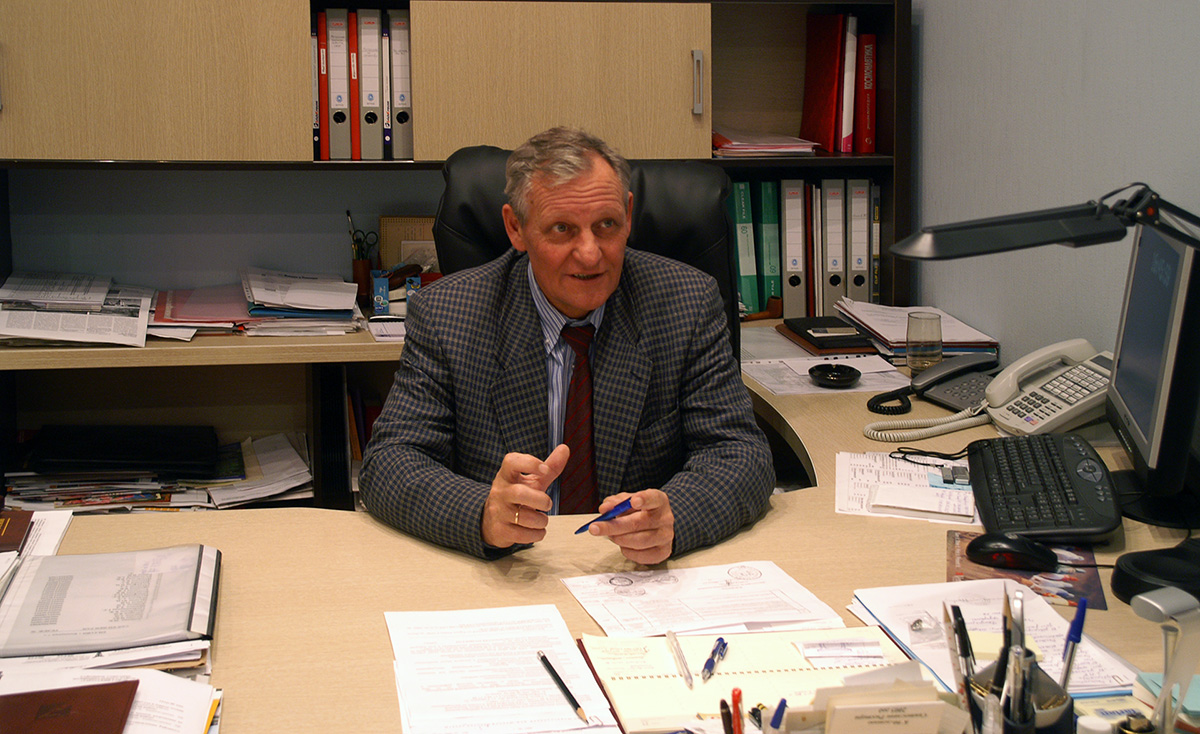
- Born: 26 June 1947; Frunze, Soviet Union
- Died: 16 October 2013 (aged 66); Moscow, Russia
- Scientific career
- Fields: Engineering (mechanics)
- Workplaces: Russian Space Research Institute

Mikhail Borisovich Dobriyan (Russian: Михаил Борисович Добриян; 26 June 1947 – 16 November 2013), was a Russian engineer in the former Soviet space program and a former director of the Space Research Institute of the Russian Academy of Sciences in Tarusa. He was one of the leading figures in the programs of the International Astrophysical Observatory GRANAT and Vega program. He was a head of Tarussky District and an honorary citizen of the city of Tarusa. A street there is named in his honor, and a memorial is dedicated to his memory.

== Other awards ==
- Order of Lenin
- Order of the Red Banner of Labour
- Order "For Merit to the Fatherland" II class
- Medal of Sergey Korolev
- Medal "For Battle Merit"
