= Thomas P. Smith Water Reclamation Facility =

The Thomas P. Smith Water Reclamation Facility (TPSWRF) is owned and operated by the city of Tallahassee, Florida. The facility provides sewage treatment services for Tallahassee, Florida and the surrounding areas.

== Facility Overview ==
The TPSWRF is permitted to treat 26.5 million gallons per day (MGD) and the facility is capable of handling peak flows up to 53 MGD.

Continual monitoring serves to protect the delicate microbial ecosystems in the treatment process. The microbes drive the aerobic decomposition and anaerobic digestion of the raw sewage to eventually form a safe effluent that can be dispersed back into the environment. The byproducts of this process are eventually separated into liquids and solid matter, known as effluent and biosolids, respectively. The influent, effluent, biosolids and other parts of the process are constantly monitored by the Water Quality Lab for a variety of chemical parameters to ensure the facility meets both state and federal regulations.

== History ==
The Thomas P. Smith Waster Reclamation Facility started out as the Springhill Road Sewage Treatment Facility in 1966. It consisted of a 2.5 MGD trickling filter. With the first expansion in the 1970s the facility was renamed to the Thomas P. Smith Wastewater Treatment Facility. This expansion added an activated sludge treatment train with surface aerators, increasing the capacity of the facility. In the 1980s the capacity was increased again with the addition of another activated sludge treatment train, using course bubble diffusion. The last expansion occurred in the 1990s when a Modified Ludzack-Ettinger activated sludge train was constructed, bringing the permitted capacity up to 27.5 MGD.

Between 2009 and 2015, TPSWRF underwent a major facility upgrade in treatment ability that coincided with a decrease in capacity by 1 MGD. With a total capital budget of nearly $230 million and a schedule of 6 years, the Advanced Wastewater Treatment (AWT) project stands as the largest project undertaken by the City of Tallahassee at that time. The project entailed the planning, design, and construction of new and upgraded facilities that resulted in the treated wastewater meeting advanced wastewater treatment standards. In particular, the AWT improvements significantly reduced the total nitrogen in the treated wastewater discharged at the City's Southeast Farm and thus minimizing the City's contribution of nitrogen to the Floridian Aquifer that subsequently flows into the Wakulla Springs and River. The AWT Project also included construction of new facilities that treat the solids by-product generated by the wastewater treatment process, resulting in production of Class AA "Biosolids," the highest quality level attainable in Florida and which then can be recycled as fertilizer.

== Treatment Process ==
The City's wastewater treatment system consists of the Thomas P. Smith Water Reclamation Facility (TPSWRF), the Southeast Farm (SEF) and the Tram Road Reuse Facility (TRRF). A sanitary sewer collection system transports sewage from homes and businesses within the City of Tallahassee Urban Service Area. This collection system is supported by over 100 pumping stations using approximately 150 miles of force main. These pipes that carry sewage are completely separate from the system that carries stormwater. Flows from the collection system are delivered to the TPSWRF for treatment.

The sewage treatment process at TPS consists of Preliminary Treatment, Primary Treatment, Secondary Treatment, Tertiary and Disinfection. The byproducts of this process are eventually separated into liquids and solid matter, known as effluent and biosolids, respectively. The treated effluent from TPS is transmitted to either the SEF for agricultural reuse or to the TRRF providing public access reuse water to the neighboring area. Biosolids are marketed and distributed.

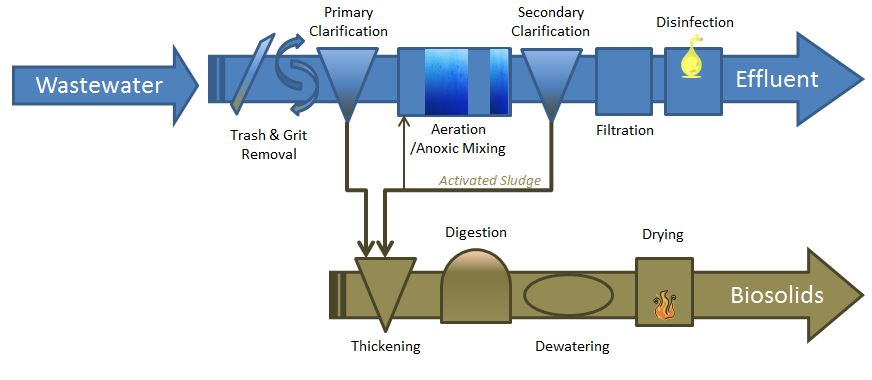
Process Flow Diagram of TPSWRF

=== Effluent Distribution ===
The majority of the treated, or reclaimed water is reused for spray irrigation on agricultural crops and pasture. The City facilities used for effluent spray irrigation include the Southwest Sprayfield, located at the TPS facility, and the Southeast Farm Reuse Facility, located eight miles east of the TPS facility on Tram Road. The City of Tallahassee's reclaimed water system comprises both a Public Access Reuse system and a Restricted Access Reuse system. The Public Access Reuse system is served from the Tram Road Reuse Facility and has the capacity to provide 1.2 million gallons per day, serving commercial customers in the Southwood area since 2008. There are two areas in which Restricted Access Reuse water is utilized: the Southwest Sprayfield and the Southeast Farm facility. The Southwest Sprayfield came online in 1966 and currently covers approximately 60 acres. The Southeast Farm has been in operation since 1980 and now has just over 2,500 acres permitted for irrigation use. The main crops grown at the Southeast Farm are corn, soybeans, coastal Bermuda grass as well as other feed and fodder crops. Between these reuse systems the City of Tallahassee has been reusing 100% of the treated water since 1984. These systems are reusing about 17 to 18 million gallons a day of reclaimed water.

==== Southeast Farm ====
Beginning in 1966, the City of Tallahassee began to experiment with using the treated effluent water to irrigate crops. Since then, the system has been expanded several times and Tallahassee currently recycles all of its effluent wastewater in this manner. After treatment at TPS, effluent is pumped through a 36-inch diameter pipe along an eight-and-a-half mile route to the Southeast Farm. With the oversight of licensed wastewater treatment operators, a computer system controls the center-pivot sprinkler systems and the distribution of water through them. Various crops such as canola, corn, soybeans, hay and sorghum can be grown year round.

The farm has won awards such as the 1994 Infrastructure Award (featured at the top of this page) from the American City & County Magazine, the 1995 U.S.E.P.A. Award for the Most Effective and Innovative Reclamation and Reuse Program, the 1997 David W. York Water Reuse Award.

==== Tram Road Reuse Facility ====
The Tram Road Reuse Facility (TRRF) is the first in the region to provide reclaimed or recycled wastewater for irrigation of public areas, such as golf courses and roadsides. It represents a successful partnership between the City's Water Utility, the Florida Department of Environmental Protection (FDEP), the Northwest Florida Water Management District (NWFWMD) and the St. Joe Company.

The 1.2 million-gallon-per-day plant takes a portion of the treated wastewater bound for the City's Southeast Farm facility and adds additional treatment so the reclaimed water can be used for irrigation purposes in public areas. Primarily, the effluent from TPS is filtered one more time at TRRF and is given extra chlorine before being stored in a tank until it is used for irrigation.

=== Biosolids Treatment & Distribution ===
Biosolids at the TPS facility undergo four major steps:

- Thickening – The solids from the primary and secondary clarifiers are thickened separately, then mixed prior to anaerobic digestion.
- Anaerobic Digestion – Four anaerobic digesters are used to stabilize and volatilize the solids.
- Dewatering – Centrifuges are used to reduce the liquids in the solids.
- Thermal Heat Drying – An Andritz thermal heat dryer creates a Class AA biosolids material that can be beneficially reused. The final product is sold to area farmers and soil amendment mixing companies.

Domestic Wastewater Biosolids (from FDEP)

"When domestic wastewater is treated, a solid by-product accumulates in the wastewater treatment plant and must be removed periodically to keep the plant operating properly. The collected material, called biosolids or more commonly "sewage sludge," is high in organic content, and contains moderate amounts of nutrients that are needed by plants. These characteristics make biosolids valuable as a soil conditioner and fertilizer.

Properly treated biosolids may be used as a fertilizer supplement or soil amendment, subject to regulatory requirements that have been established to protect public health and the environment. These requirements (found in Chapter 62-640, F.A.C.) include pollutant limits, treatment to destroy harmful microorganisms, and management practices for land application sites. Biosolids may be used by application to land in farming and ranching operations, forest lands, and public areas such as parks, or in land reclamation projects such as restoration of mining properties. The highest quality of biosolids, known in Florida as "Class AA," are distributed and marketed like other commercial fertilizers."

Class AA biosolids from the City of Tallahassee are sold in bulk quantities to golf courses, farmers and to fertilizer bagging companies.

=== Septage ===
In addition to serving customers in the city of Tallahassee through the sewage collection system, the TPS also provides septage receiving services to those companies doing business in Leon, Gadsden, Jefferson and Wakulla Counties. This includes materials from septage tanks, portable toilets, and grease traps. Restaurant grease and landfill leachate is not accepted. Septage materials are screened and either sent to the facility headworks or to the anaerobic digesters.
