= Detail =

Detail(s) or The Detail(s) may refer to:

== Film and television ==
- Details (film), a 2003 Swedish film
- The Details (film), a 2011 American film
- The Detail, a Canadian television series
- "The Detail" (The Wire), a television episode

== Music ==
- Details (album), by Frou Frou, 2002
- "Details", a song by Maisie Peters from Dressed Too Nice for a Jacket, 2018
- Detail (record producer), Noel Fisher (born c. 1978), American music producer and performer
- The Details, a Canadian rock band

== Periodicals ==
- DETAIL (professional journal), an architecture and construction journal
- Details (magazine), an American men's magazine

== Other uses ==
- Detail (work of art), an isolated work of art
- DETAIL, a mnemonic acronym used in integration by parts

== See also ==
- Auto detailing, a car-cleaning process
- Level of detail (computer graphics), a 3D computer graphics concept
- Security detail, a team assigned to protect an individual or group
- Detaille Island, Antarctica
