= Sergey Kravtsov =

Sergey Kravtsov may refer to:

- Sergey Kravtsov (sailor) (born 1960), Belarusian Olympic sailor
- Sergey Kravtsov (cyclist) (born 1948), Soviet Olympic cyclist
- Sergey Kravtsov (politician) (born 1974), Russian politician, Minister of Education since 2020
