= Reclaiming Futures =

Reclaiming Futures is a non-profit organization aimed at assisting teenagers out of trouble with drugs, alcohol and crime. It began in 2001 with $21 million from The Robert Wood Johnson Foundation. As of 2010 it operates with funding from the Robert Wood Johnson Foundation, the U.S. Office of Juvenile Justice and Delinquency Prevention (OJJDP), the Center for Substance Abuse Treatment and the Kate B. Reynolds Charitable Trust.

== Overview ==
Reclaiming Futures has created a six-step model for steering young people out of difficulties with addictive substances and crime. Key elements of the model include screening and assessing teens for drug and alcohol problems and assembling a team to develop a strength-based care plan; training drug and alcohol treatment providers in evidence-based practices shown to have worked with teens; and involving community members as natural helpers and role models to provide support.

== Collaboration ==
In the locations where the group operates, teams of people associated with the juvenile justice system work together to help teens in the system with substance abuse issues. The teams consist of judges, probation officers, treatment professionals, community members and families, all working together on behalf of young people. As of 2010 the group is based at the Regional Research Institute for Human Services of the Graduate School of Social work at Portland State University in the United States, and operates in 26 communities across the U.S.

According to evaluation by the Urban Institute and the University of Chicago’s Chapin Hall Center for Children, communities that piloted the Reclaiming Futures approach to helping teens overcome drugs, alcohol and crime reported significant improvements in juvenile justice and substance abuse treatment, and an additional evaluation showed that eight communities that piloted the Reclaiming Futures model have improved the social networks that juvenile justice and substance abuse agencies use to communicate and cooperate with one another.

== Funding ==
According to the OJJDP, funding for the Juvenile Drug Court/Reclaiming Futures Program and Brief Interventions and Referrals to Treatment for Courts and Juvenile Drug Courts is provided by the U.S. Bureau of Justice Assistance but administered by OJJDP. In 2007, the OJJDP awarded nearly $1.3 million to three grantees for programs that applied the Reclaiming Futures model to their juvenile drug courts by helping youth meet educational goals, identifying juveniles requiring substance abuse treatment, and effectively engaging youth in treatment by increasing the number and range of available options.

== See also ==
- The Book of Drugs
- Magdalene program
