= Claim =

Claim may refer to:

- Claim (legal)
- Claim of Right Act 1689
- Claims-based identity
- Claim (philosophy)
- Land claim
- A main contention, see conclusion of law
- Patent claim, a definition of the scope of the protection conferred by a patent or sought in a patent application
- The assertion of a proposition; see Douglas N. Walton
- A right
- Sequent, in mathematics
- Another term for an advertising slogan
  - Health claim
- A term in contract bridge

== Entertainment ==
- The Claim, a 2000 British-Canadian Western romance film
- The Claim (band), a British band

== See also ==
- "Claimed", an episode of the television series The Walking Dead
- Reclaim (disambiguation)
