= Reclamation (Bigwig album) =

Studio album by Bigwig
- Released: February 7, 2006
- Recorded: November–December 2005
- Studio: The Soundmine, East Stroudsburg, Pennsylvania
- Genre: Punk rock, melodic hardcore, hardcore punk
- Label: Fearless

Bigwig chronology
| An Invitation to Tragedy (2001) | Reclamation (2006) |

Professional ratings
Review scores
| Source | Rating |
|---|---|
| Allmusic | 4/5 stars |

Reclamation is the fourth studio album by American punk rock band Bigwig. It was released on Fearless Records in 2006.

== Release ==
On December 8, 2005, Reclamation was announced for released in two months' time; its artwork and track listing was posted online. On January 7, 2006, "Owned & Operated" and "Time Bomb" were posted online, followed by "Cross and Burn" and "Follow the Leader" nine days later. Reclamation was released on February 7, 2006, through Fearless Records. It was promoted with a brief East Coast tour in February 2006. In March and April 2006, the band went on the Frostbite Tour alongside Death by Stereo, the Flatliners, and Big D and the Kids Table. Reclamation was released in Japan in June 2006, where it was promoted with a tour in that country. "Temporary Graves", a Japanese bonus track, was posted on the band's Myspace on August 4, 2006.

== Track list ==
| No. | Title | Length |
|---|---|---|
| 1. | "A War Inside" | 2:10 |
| 2. | "Owned and Operated" | 3:05 |
| 3. | "Outer Rings" | 3:14 |
| 4. | "Cross and Burn" | 1:55 |
| 5. | "Follow the Leader" | 3:15 |
| 6. | "Rat Race" | 3:37 |
| 7. | "Reclamation" | 4:29 |
| 8. | "Timebomb" | 3:03 |
| 9. | "Last Song, Last Call" | 2:20 |
| 10. | "Hold on Fucker" | 2:41 |
| 11. | "No Thought, No Spine" | 2:57 |
