= Gorbatovka =

Gorbatovka Горба́товка
- Urban-type settlement
- Interactive map of Gorbatovka
- Location of Gorbatovka Gorbatovka (Nizhny Novgorod Oblast)
- Coordinates: 56°15′20″N 43°44′0″E
- Country: Russia
- Federal subject: Nizhny Novgorod Oblast

Population (2010 Census)
  - Total: 3,378
  - Estimate (2023): 3,173 (−6.1%)
- Time zone: UTC+3 (MSK)
- Postal code: 606042
- OKTMO ID: 22721000061

Gorbatovka (Russian: Горба́товка) is an urban locality (a work settlement) under the administrative jurisdiction of the city of oblast significance of Dzerzhinsk in Nizhny Novgorod Oblast, Russia, located 23 kilometers (14 mi) west of Nizhny Novgorod, in the vicinity of the Nizhny Novgorod International Airport. Population: 3,378 (2010 census); 3,321 (2002 census); 4,452 (1989 Soviet census).
