= Enamel =

Enamel may refer to:

== Decorative arts ==
- Vitreous enamel, a smooth, durable coating for metal, made of melted and fused glass powder
- Enamelled glass, glass that has been decorated with vitreous enamel
- Overglaze enamelling, painting on top of glaze in pottery

== Dentistry ==
- Tooth enamel, the hard mineralised surface of teeth
- Enamel organ, a cellular aggregation in a developing tooth that is responsible for the formation of enamel

== Industrial products ==
- Enamel paint, commercial paint that dries to an especially hard glossy finish
- Enameled wire, wire insulated with a hard polymer coating
