= Reclamation fund =

Special fund established in 1902 by the United States Department of the Interior

The reclamation fund is a special fund established by the United States Congress under the Reclamation Act of 1902, as amended, for receipts from the sale of public lands and timber, proceeds from the Mineral Leasing Act, and certain other revenues. Congress appropriates money from this fund for the investigation, construction, operation, and administration of Bureau of Reclamation projects. Collections from water users for payments made on the reimbursable costs of the federal projects are also returned to the fund.
