= Orenburg Cossacks =

Host of Cossacks in Orenburg Governorate

The Orenburg Cossack Host (Russian: Оренбургское казачье войско) was a part of the Cossack population in pre-revolutionary Russia, located in the Orenburg province (today's Orenburg Oblast, part of the Chelyabinsk Oblast and Bashkortostan).

== History ==
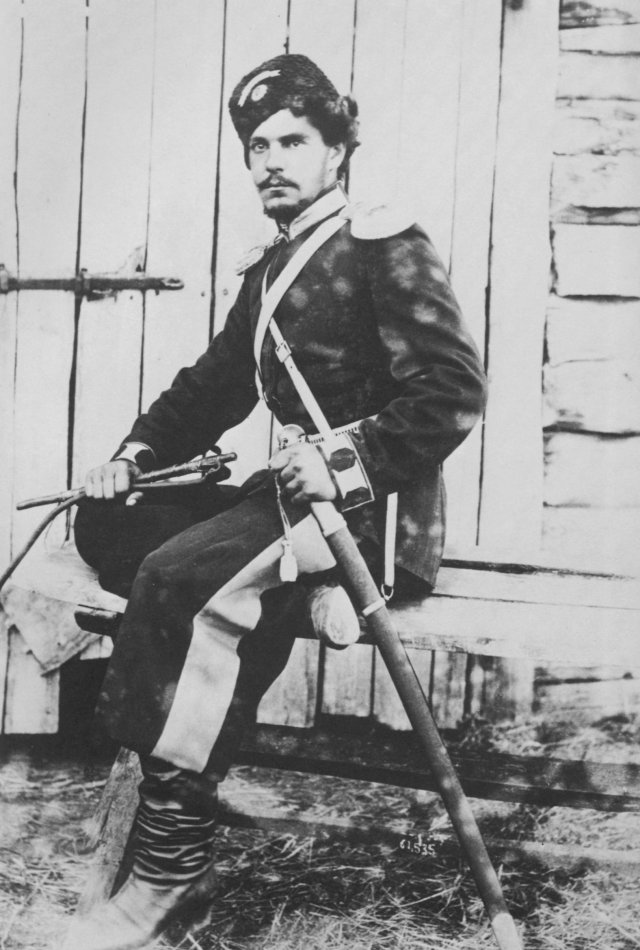
A Cossack officer from Orenburg, with a shashka at his side and a nagaika in his hand, early 1900s

After having constructed fortifications around the future town of Orenburg in 1734, they officially founded it in 1735. For the purpose of defending the city and colonizing the region, the Russian government relocated the Cossacks from Ufa, Iset, Samara and other places and created the Orenburg non-regular corps in 1748. In 1755, a part of it was transformed into the Orenburg Cossack Host with 2,000 men.

In 1773–1774, the Orenburg Cossacks took part in Yemelyan Pugachev's insurrection. In 1798, all of the Cossack settlements in the Southern Urals were incorporated into the Orenburg Cossack Host (except for the Ural Cossacks). A decree of 1840 established the borders of the Host and its composition (10 cavalry regiments and 3 artillery battalions). In the mid-19th century, the Cossack population of this region equaled 200,000 people.

The Orenburg Host participated in the Russo-Swedish War of 1788–1790, and later in the campaigns that Russia waged in order to conquer Central Asia.

== Organisation ==
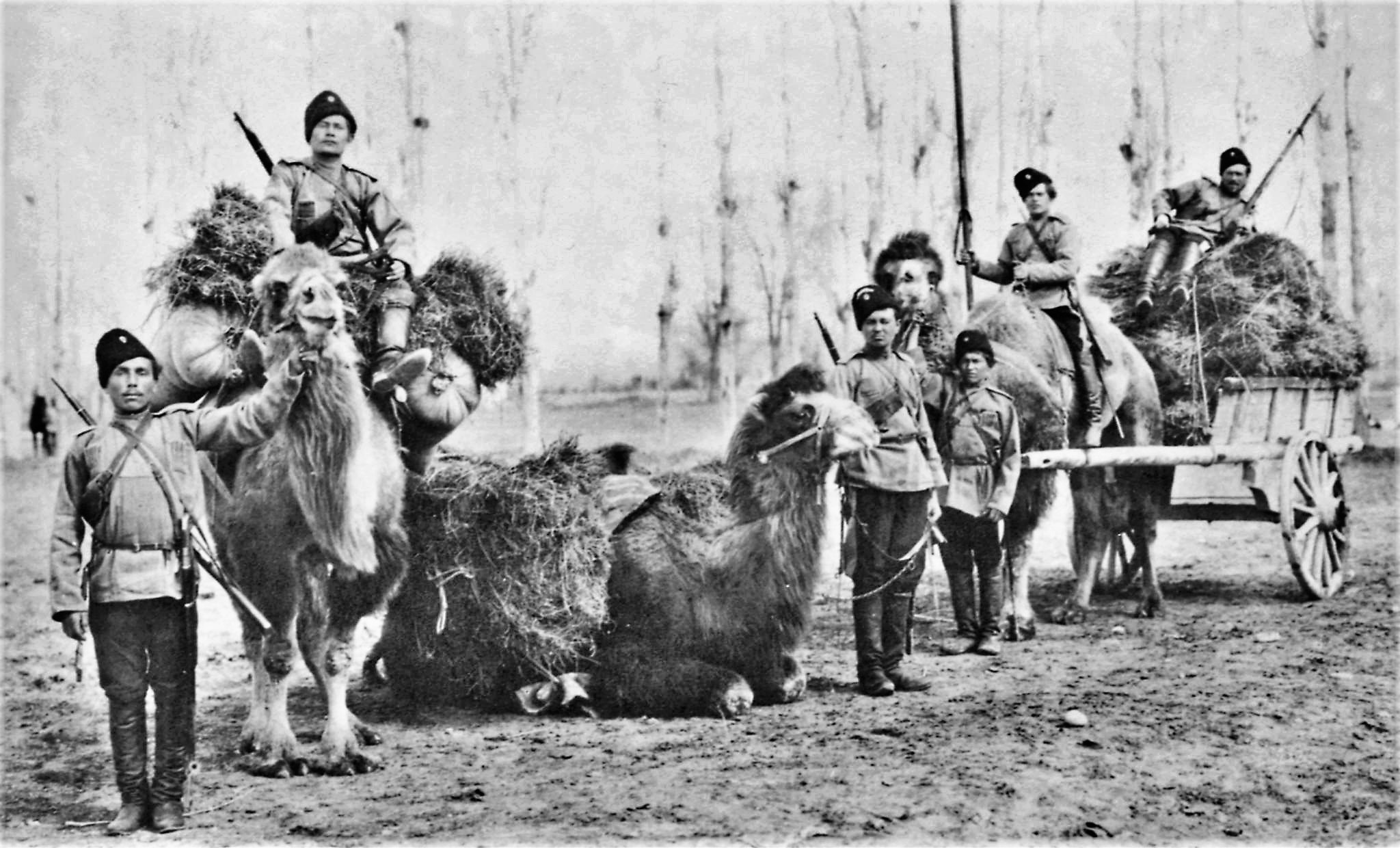
Orenburg Cossacks on camels, c. 1910

The Orenburg Host consisted of 2 districts, or okrugs (after 1878 - 3 departments, or otdels). By 1916, the Cossack population of this region had grown to 533,000 people occupying a territory of 7,45 million desyatinas. One desyatina equaled 2,7 acres (11,000 m^{2}). In the early 19th century, the Orenburg Cossack Host supplied 6 cavalry regiments, 3 artillery battalions, 1 cavalry battalion, 1 sotnia (100 men) of guards and 2 detached sotnias. During World War I, the Orenburg Cossack Host supplied 18 cavalry regiments, 9,5 artillery battalions, 1 cavalry battalion, 1 sotnia of guards, 9 unmounted sotnias, 7,5 reserve sotnias and 39 detached and special sotnias (to a total of about 27,000 men).

== Post revolution ==
After the October Revolution of 1917, the leadership of the Orenburg Cossack Host, under the command of Ataman Alexander Dutov, fought against the Turkestan Red Army. The poorer Cossacks joined the ranks of the Red Army. The 1st Orenburg Cossack Socialist Regiment took part in the Ural Army Campaign of 1918.

In 1920, the Orenburg Cossack Host ceased to exist.

== Distinctions ==
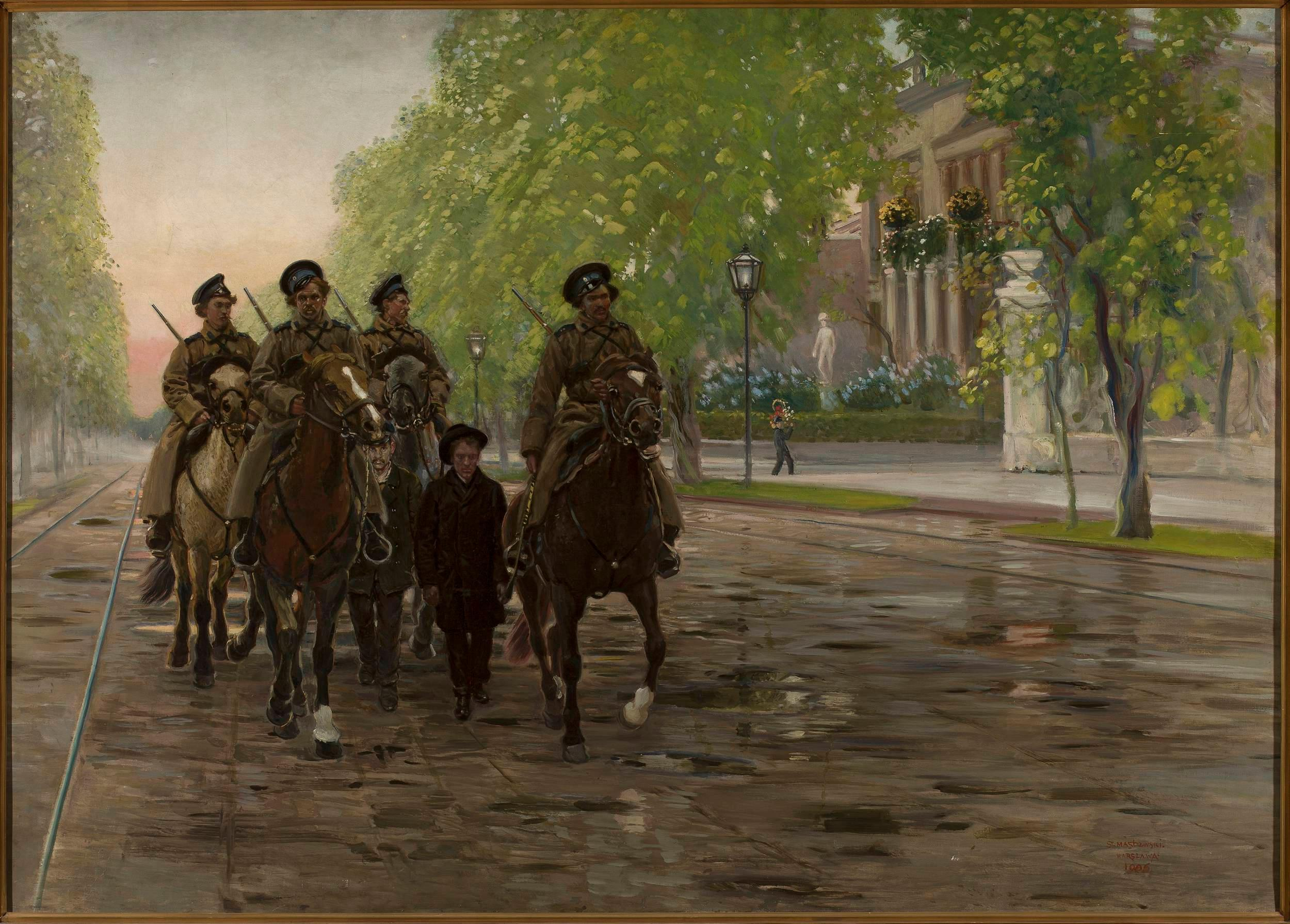
Wiosna roku 1905 (Spring of 1905) by Stanisław Masłowski, 1906 – Orenburg Cossacks patrol at Ujazdowskie Avenue in Warsaw (National Museum in Warsaw)

The distinguishing colour of the Orenburg Cossack Host was light blue; worn on the cap bands, shoulder straps and wide trouser stripes of a dark green uniform, of the loose-fitting cut common to the Steppe Cossacks. High fleece hats were worn on occasion with light blue cloth tops. Officers wore silver epaulettes and braiding. After 1907, a khaki-grey service uniform of standard Imperial Cavalry pattern was introduced, but the light blue distinctions were retained until 1920.

== See also ==
- Nagaybaks, Tatar-speaking Cossacks belonging to the Orenburg Host

== External ==
- Petr I. Avdeev Istoricheskaya Zapiska ob Orenburgskom Kazach'em Voiske, 1904
