= RAF Dry Tree =

Former Royal Air Force early warning station in Cornwall, England

RAF Dry Tree
- Goonhilly Downs; Near Helston, Cornwall in England
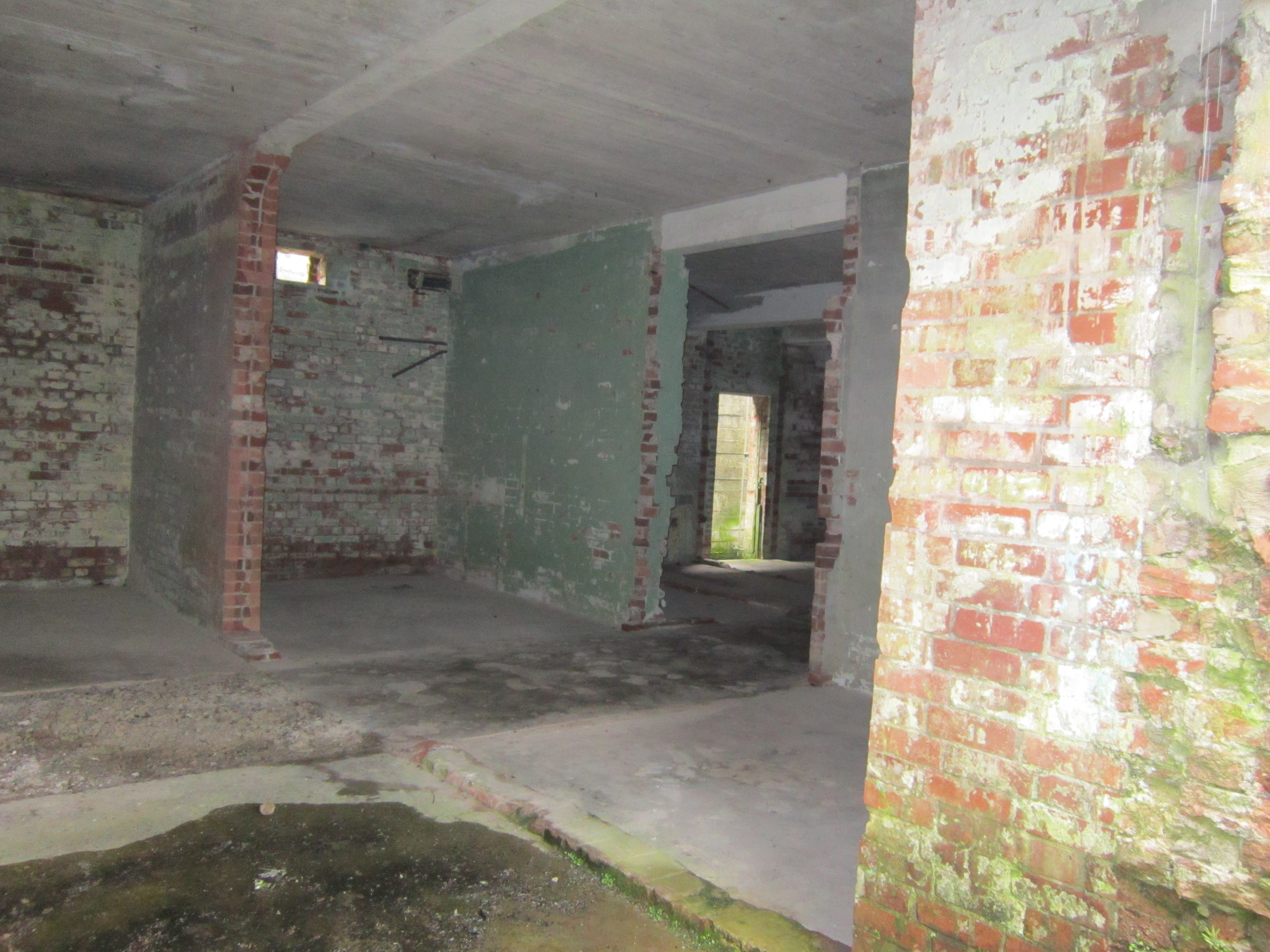
- View inside the receiver block at RAF Dry Tree.

Site information
- Type: Chain Home radar station
- Owner: Air Ministry
- Operator: Royal Air Force
- Open to the public: yes

Location
- Shown with Cornwall RAF Dry Tree (the United Kingdom)
- Coordinates: 50°2′44.1″N 5°12′18.24″W
- Height: four 360 feet (110 m) transmitter masts

Site history
- Built: 1940
- In use: 1940-
- Fate: demolished with the exception of ground level buildings and concrete hardstandings
- Battles/wars: Second World War

RAF Dry Tree was a Royal Air Force early warning radar station for detecting enemy aircraft during the Second World War. It was built in 1940 on Goonhilly Downs, on the Lizard peninsula in Cornwall, a short distance to the south-east of the Goonhilly Earth Station. It was named from the standing stone on the land known as the Dry Tree menhir.

== Purpose ==
Its purpose was detecting aircraft approaching South Cornwall and the Western Approaches. It had four 360 feet (110 m) transmitter masts and two 240 ft (73 m) wooden receiver masts. Its existence was only revealed after the war had ended. Most of the station was destroyed in the early 1960s to make way for the satellite communication station. Some buildings and structures still exist and are located within a nature reserve. The nerve centre was the receiver block which now has public access to the roof, giving excellent views across the Downs. Other buildings and structures which were part of RAF Dry Tree can also be seen.

== Dry Tree menhir ==
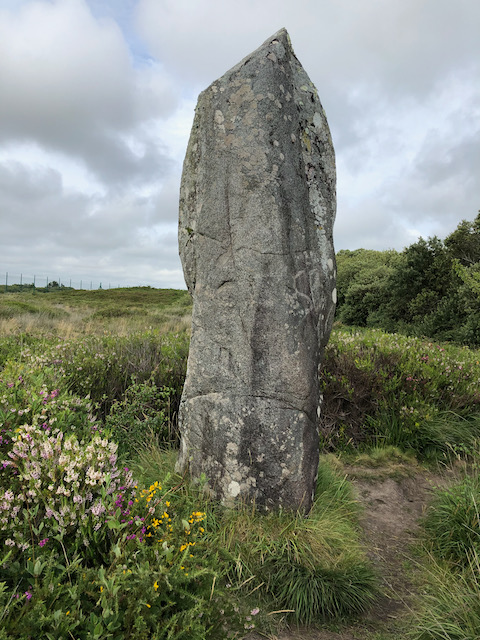
The Dry Tree menhir, a standing stone from which the station took its name. Cornish heath is seen in the foreground

The Dry Tree menhir is a ten foot standing stone located on the ex-RAF Dry Tree site at Goonhilly, from which the station takes its name. The menhir was seemingly named Dry Tree due its resemblance to a dry tree trunk.

The location of the menhir was where the boundaries for six parishes met in medieval times. It dates back around 3,500 years. It was dug out during the 19th century (by gold hunters) and was put back in its upward position in 1927, after World War I, but soldiers had cut one metre off its top.

Dry Tree is west of Traboe.

== See also ==
- List of former Royal Air Force stations
