= Poldhu =

Coordinates: 50.0337°N 5.2606°W

Poldhu: Cornish: Polldu
- Location within Cornwall
- OS grid reference: SW663197
- Civil parish: Mullion
- Unitary authority: Cornwall
- Ceremonial county: Cornwall
- Region: South West
- Country: England
- Sovereign state: United Kingdom
- Post town: HELSTON
- Postcode district: TR12
- Dialling code: 01326
- Police: Devon and Cornwall
- Fire: Cornwall
- Ambulance: South Western
- UK Parliament: St Ives

Poldhu (Cornish: Polldu) is a small area in south Cornwall, England, UK, situated on the Lizard Peninsula; it comprises Poldhu Point and Poldhu Cove. Poldhu means "black pool" in Cornish. Poldhu lies on the coast of Mount's Bay and is in the northern part of the parish of Mullion; the churchtown is 2 kilometres (1.2 mi) to the south-east. On the north side of Poldhu Cove is the parish of Gunwalloe and the village of Porthleven is a further 7 kilometres (4.3 mi) to the north.

Poldhu Point became the site of one of the main technological advances of the early twentieth century when, on 12 December 1901, a wireless signal was sent by Thomas Barron in Poldhu to St. John's, Newfoundland, and received by Guglielmo Marconi. The technology was a precursor to radio, television, satellites and the internet, with the earth station at Goonhilly Downs a nearby example.

The beach at Poldhu was heavily mined during World War II to prevent any prospect of a German force landing there. As a result, on 24 April 1943, Royal Air Force Volunteer Reserve members Mair Myfannwy Richards and Reginald Thomas Smith both died instantly when Mair trod on an unmarked mine.

In January 2016, Poldhu Cove was inundated with thousands of pink plastic bottles, brought onto the beach with successive tides. The National Trust, which organised the clean-up, thought they had likely come from a container ship, and had been washed overboard in recent storms.

== Marconi's Poldhu Wireless Station ==
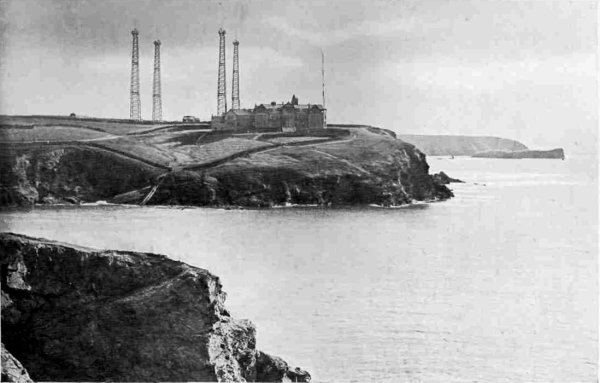
The station, with four masts.

The site is famous as the location of Poldhu Wireless Station, Guglielmo Marconi's transmitter for the first transatlantic radio message on 12 December 1901. Marconi received the transmission on Signal Hill, St. John's, Newfoundland. The station was built partly on cliff top pastures that had been enclosed in 1871 and partly on medieval fields belonging to a nearby settlement, Angrouse. The fifty acre (200,000 m^{2}) plot was bought in 1900 and building work ran from October 1900 to January 1901. During the work two Bronze Age barrows were flattened and a bronze dagger and urn were recovered.

To design the spark transmitter, the first high power radio transmitter in the world, Marconi hired Prof. John Ambrose Fleming, University College, London. The original twenty mast circular aerial was destroyed in a storm on 17 September 1901. Marconi hastily built a temporary aerial of 50 wires suspended in a fan shape from a cable between two 200 foot (61 m) masts. Fleming estimated the transmitter's radiated power was around 10–12 kW. The frequency used is not known precisely, as Marconi did not measure wavelength or frequency, but it was between 166 and 984 kHz, probably around 500 kHz. After the experiment the original mast layout was not rebuilt, it was replaced with a four mast design, 215 feet (66 m) high and forming a 200-foot (61 m) square.

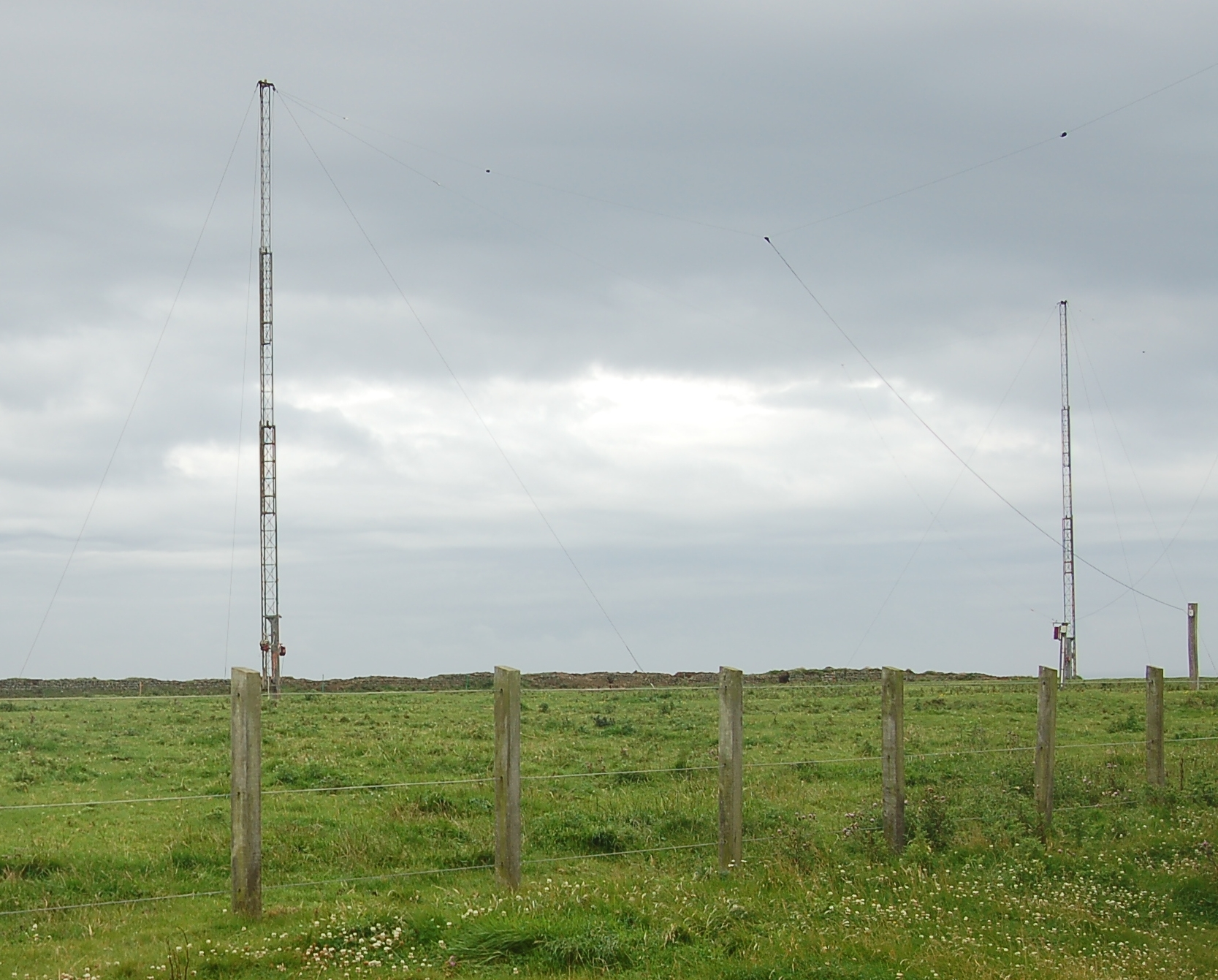
Area of the station in the year 2007, antennas operated by the Poldhu Amateur Radio Club

Marconi later used the site for his shortwave experiments, with transmissions by Charles Samuel Franklin to Marconi on the yacht "Elettra". in the Cape Verde Islands in 1923 and in Beirut in 1924. The groundbreaking results of these experiments took the world by surprise and quickly resulted in his development of the Beam Wireless Service for the British General Post Office. The service opened from the Bodmin Beam Station to Canada on 25 October 1926, from the Tetney Beam Station to Australia on 8 April 1927, from the Bodmin Beam Station to South Africa on 5 July 1927, to India on 6 September 1927 and shortly afterwards to Argentina, Brazil and the United States.

The station closed in 1934 and was demolished in 1937. Six acres (24,000 m^{2}) were given to the National Trust in 1937 with the rest of the site added in 1960. The site has a stone monument pillar, erected in November 1937 by the Marconi Company, and a number of concrete foundations and earth structures also remain. In 2001 the Marconi Centre, a new museum / meeting building, was opened close to the site by the efforts of the Poldhu Amateur Radio Club, the National Trust, and Marconi plc.

The substantial building near the site, originally the Poldhu Hotel, built in 1899, is currently a care home. The visitors' book shows that Marconi stayed there in May and August 1901.

Marconi also built an earlier, smaller, experimental wireless station nearby at Housel Bay – The Lizard Wireless Station.

== In popular culture ==
Sherlock Holmes and Dr. Watson are staying "together in a small cottage near Poldhu Bay" in "The Adventure of the Devil's Foot", a 1910 short story by Arthur Conan Doyle.

In the first episode of the 2018 female-led adaptation Miss Sherlock, "Poldhu" is the name of a brand of wireless medical telemetry devices in the form of a capsule that is swallowed by the user, which the murderer exploits as triggers for liquid bombs that destroy the abdominal cavities of her victims.
