= List of shipwrecks in September 1856 =

The list of shipwrecks in September 1856 includes ships sunk, foundered, grounded, or otherwise lost during September 1856.

== 1 September ==
List of shipwrecks: 1 September 1856
Ship	State	Description
Delaval	United Kingdom	The brig ran aground on the Holm Sand, in the North Sea off the coast of Suffolk. She was on a voyage from Hartlepool, County Durham to Rochester, Kent. She was refloated and taken in to Kessingland, resuming her voyage after taking on two extra hands.
Frederika	Sweden	The schooner ran aground on a reef off Åland. She was on a voyage from Stockholm to Hull, Yorkshire, United Kingdom. She refloated and taken in to a port on Gotland.
Jane	(United Kingdom of Great Britain and Ireland) Victoria	The schooner was destroyed by fire near Palliser Bay, New Zealand. The ship's crew of six escaped safely in the lifeboat.
Mathilde	France	The schooner was wrecked on the Corton Sands, in the North Sea off the coast of Suffolk. Her crew survived. She was on a voyage from South Shields, County Durham to Cherbourg, Manche.
Sangeen	United Kingdom	The barque ran aground on being launched in the Saint Charles River.
Zephyr	(United Kingdom of Great Britain and Ireland) Jersey	The sloop capsized and sank off the Shipwash Sand, in the North Sea off the coast of Suffolk with the loss of one of her four crew. Survivors were rescued by the schooner Mary Sharp (United Kingdom). Zephyr was on a voyage from Seaham, County Durham to Jersey.

== 3 September ==
List of shipwrecks: 3 September 1856
Ship	State	Description
British Princess	United Kingdom	The barque ran aground on a reef off Valentia Harbour, County Kerry. She was on a voyage from Miramichi, New Brunswick, British North America to Belfast, County Antrim. She was refloated with assistance from "HMS Meander" (Royal Navy) and towed in to Valnetia Harbour in a waterlogged condition.
Mary Ruth	United Kingdom	The ship was lost near "Wyburg" with the loss of her captain.
Perseverance	United States	The ship was destroyed by fire at a Texan port. Her crew survived.
Sophie	Denmark	The ship was wrecked near Kronstadt, Russia.
Tre Broders	Sweden	The schooner was taken in to Great Yarmouth, Norfolk, United Kingdom in a derelict condition by Eugenie (Netherlands).
Vigilant	France	The ship ran aground on the Sunk Sand, in the North Sea off the coast of Essex, United Kingdom. She was on a voyage from Blyth, Northumberland, United Kingdom to Granville, Manche. She was refloated and taken in ton Wivenhoe, Essex.
Wasp	United States	The brig was driven ashore at Cape Charles, Virginia, United States. She was on a voyage from Nassau, Bahamas to New York.

== 4 September ==
List of shipwrecks: 4 September 1856
Ship	State	Description
Aid	United Kingdom	The brig was abandoned in the Atlantic Ocean. Her crew survived. She was on a voyage from Black River, Jamaica to Liverpool, Lancashire.
Arab	United Kingdom	The barque capsized at Danzig. Her crew were rescued.
British Dominion	United Kingdom	The paddle steamer was wrecked on the Hauxley Rocks, Northumberland.
Charity	United Kingdom	The brig sank in the North Sea 5 leagues (15 nautical miles (28 km)) off Brielle, South Holland, Netherlands. Her crew were rescued. She was on a voyage from Sunderland, County Durham to Schiedam, South Holland.
Flavius	United Kingdom	The ship was driven ashore at Woosung, China. She was on a voyage from Hong Kong to Shanghai, China.
Inchinnan	United Kingdom	The ship was driven ashore and wrecked at Shanghai, China. She was refloated on 7 October with assistance from HMS Encounter (Royal Navy) and taken in to Shanghai for repairs.
Newcastle	United Kingdom	The steamship ran aground and was wrecked in Kragerøsund.

== 5 September ==
List of shipwrecks: 5 September 1856
Ship	State	Description
Arabia	United States	Carrying a 200-short-ton (179-long-ton; 181-tonne) cargo of merchandise, tools, and United States Mail, the steamboat struck a snag and sank in the Missouri River 6 miles (9.7 km) above Kansas City, Kansas. All on board survived. Her wreck was discovered on 26 November 1988 buried 45 feet (14 m) beneath a cornfield and was excavated and preserved.
Constantine	United Kingdom	The ship departed from Baltimore, Maryland, United States for London. Subsequently foundered with the loss of all hands. A boat from the ship was discovered 100 nautical miles (190 km) south of Queenstown, County Cork before 28 October.
Lammergeir	United Kingdom	The ship ran aground on the Goodwin Sands, Kent. She was on a voyage from Saint Stephen, New Brunswick, British North America to London. She was refloated and taken in to Deal, Kent.
Ocean Home	United States	The full-rigged ship was run into by the full-rigged ship Cherubin (United States) and foundered in the English Channel 20 nautical miles (37 km) south of The Lizard, Cornwall, United Kingdom with the loss of 71 of the 94 people on board. Survivors were rescued by Cherubin, the pilot boat No. 3. and the pilot sloop Perseverance and the schooner Martha (all United Kingdom). Ocean Home was on a voyage from Rotterdam, South Holland, Netherlands to New York.
Prins Oscar	Sweden	The steamship ran aground at Sandhamn and was damaged. She was on a voyage from Gothenburg to Hull, Yorkshire, United Kingdom.
Titan	United States	The tug was driven ashore and wrecked south of the Squan Inlet.

== 6 September ==
List of shipwrecks: 6 September 1856
Ship	State	Description
Aurora	United Kingdom	The brig was abandoned in the Atlantic Ocean (28°30′N 52°33′W). Her nine crew were rescued by the barque Erromanga (United Kingdom). Aurora was on a voyage from Quebec City, Province of Canada, British North America to Hartlepool, County Durham.
Janet Croll	United Kingdom	The steamship foundered in the North Sea 2.5 nautical miles (4.6 km) north west by north of the Dugdgeon Lightship ( Trinity House). Sixteen of her 30 crew were rescued by the steamship Hutton Chaytor, the rest by the steamship Ross D. Mangles (both United Kingdom). Janet Croll was on a voyage from West Hartlepool, County Durham to London.
Liffey	United Kingdom	The barque capsized at Queenstown, County Cork. She was righted the next day.
Mistley	United Kingdom	The ship was run down and sunk in the North Sea 12 nautical miles (22 km) east by north of Whitby, Yorkshire by the schooner Daquoise (France). Her crew were rescued by Emulous (United Kingdom). Mistley was on a voyage from Sunderland, County Durham to Mistley, Essex.

== 7 September ==
List of shipwrecks: 7 September 1856
Ship	State	Description
Astrabad (Астрабад)	Imperial Russian Navy	The steamship was driven ashore on Kulaly Island in the Tyuleny Archipelago, Caspian Sea. All aboard were rescued. She was subsequently refloated, with almost no damage.
Margaret	United Kingdom	The schooner was abandoned in the Dogger Bank. Her crew were rescued by a Prussian brig.

== 8 September ==
List of shipwrecks: 8 September 1856
Ship	State	Description
America	Kingdom of Sardinia	The brig was wrecked on Flores Island, Azores. She was on a voyage from Montevideo, Uruguay to an English port.
Canton	United Kingdom	The barque foundered in the Atlantic Ocean (46°40′N 37°23′W). Her 23 crew were rescued by the brig Elizabeth (United Kingdom). Canton was on a voyage from Liverpool, Lancashire to Quebec City, Province of Canada, British North America.
Columbia	United Kingdom	The ship was wrecked at the Sandheads, India. Her crew were rescued.

== 9 September ==
List of shipwrecks: 9 September 1856
Ship	State	Description
Foreningen	Norway	The sealer was abandoned near the Jisfjord. Her crew were rescued.
Sydney Hall	United Kingdom	The steamship collided with the steamship Dodo (United Kingdom) in the River Thames and was beached at Lower Hope, Kent. She was on a voyage from London to Kronstadt, Russia. She was refloated the next day and put back to London.

== 10 September ==
List of shipwrecks: 10 September 1856
Ship	State	Description
Ethelred	United Kingdom	The ship was wrecked in the Magdalen Islands, Nova Scotia, British North America. Her crew were rescued. She was on a voyage from Quebec City, Province of Canada, British North America to Swansea, Glamorgan.
John Botcherby	United Kingdom	The brig ran aground on the Hinder Sandbank, in the North Sea off the Dutch coast. She was on a voyage from Newcastle upon tyne, Northumberland to Rotterdam, South Holland, Netherlands. She was refloated with assistance from the steamship Kinderdyk (Netherlands) and three sloops and taken in to Hellevoetsluis, Zeeland, Netherlands.
Mathilde Baileysus	Danzig	The ship ran aground at Danzig. She was on a voyage from Liverpool, Lancashire, United Kingdom to Danzig. She was refloated and taken in to port.

== 11 September ==
List of shipwrecks: 11 September 1856
Ship	State	Description
Clara	(United Kingdom of Great Britain and Ireland) New Zealand	The sailing vessel hit the bar at the mouth of the Rangitikei River. There were no deaths, but the ship was a total wreck.
Columbus	United Kingdom	The brig ran aground on the Scroby Sands, Norfolk. She was refloated with assistance from two boats and a tug and resumed her voyage.
Commerce	United Kingdom	The brig ran aground on the Corton Sands, in the North Sea off the coast of Suffolk. She was on a voyage from South Shields, County Durham to London. She was refloated with assistance from a tug and resumed her voyage.
Mercury	United Kingdom	The ship ran aground on the West Hoyle Bank, in Liverpool Bay. She was refloated and towed in to Mostyn, Flintshire, where she sank.
Ratcliffe	United Kingdom	The brig was driven ashore 2 nautical miles (3.7 km) north of Bridlington, Yorkshire. She was on a voyage from London to Hartlepool, County Durham. She was refloated the next day.

== 12 September ==
List of shipwrecks: 12 September 1856
Ship	State	Description
Inchinnan	United Kingdom	The ship was driven ashore at Hong Kong.
Tryall	United Kingdom	The schooner sprang a leak and was beached at Harwich, Essex. She was on a voyage from Pevensey, Sussex to Seaham, County Durham.
Wild Flower	United Kingdom	The ship was driven ashore at Hong Kong.

== 13 September ==
List of shipwrecks: 13 September 1856
Ship	State	Description
Femmegina	Sweden	The ship was abandoned in the Kattegat. Her crew were rescued by Irene (United Kingdom). Femmegina was on a voyage from Gothenburg to Antwerp, Belgium.
Kentucky	United States	The full-rigged ship sprang a leak and sank at Lagoa, Azores. She was on a voyage from Newcastle upon Tyne, Northumberland, United Kingdom to Portsmouth, New Hampshire.
Tomoree	United States	The brig was wrecked in the Abrolhos Archipelago, Brazil. Her crew were rescued.

== 14 September ==
List of shipwrecks: 14 September 1856
Ship	State	Description
Broomielaw	United Kingdom	The ship was driven ashore at Greenock, Renfrewshire.
Brunelle	United Kingdom	The barque ran aground near Girvan, Ayrshire. Her crew survived. She was on a voyage from Greenock to Quebec City, Province of Canada, British North America.
California	United States	The ship was driven ashore at Greenock.
Hunter	United Kingdom	The barque collided with the steamship Mulvin (United Kingdom) and was beached at Deal, Kent. She was on a voyage from Sunderland, County Durham to Valencia, Spain.
Maria	United Kingdom	The sloop was wrecked on the Longsand, in the North Sea off the coast of Essex. Her crew were rescued by the smack Tryall (United Kingdom). Maria was on a voyage from Goole, Yorkshire to Shoreham-by-Sea, Sussex.
Sarah and Ann	United Kingdom	The ship ran aground at Southwold, Suffolk. She was on a voyage from South Shields, County Durham to Southwold. The next day, she was run into by Two Friends (United Kingdom) and was severely damaged. She was refloated and taken in to Southwold.

== 15 September ==
List of shipwrecks: 15 September 1856
Ship	State	Description
Concordia	United Kingdom	The ship arrived at Trieste on fire. She was on a voyage from Liverpool, Lancashire to Trieste. The fire was extinguished.
Ora	Flag unknown	The schooner was driven ashore and wrecked on Langeoog, Kingdom of Hanover with the loss of a crew member. She was on a voyage from Hull, Yorkshire, United Kingdom to Varel, Kingdom of Hanover.
Thistle	United Kingdom	The sloop was abandoned in the North Sea off the Girdle Ness Lighthouse, Aberdeenshire. Her crew were rescued by a fishing smack. Thistle was on a voyage from Inverness to Sunderland, County Durham. She was towed in to Peterhead, Aberdeenshire by the fishing smack.

== 16 September ==
List of shipwrecks: 16 September 1856
Ship	State	Description
Ahta	(Russian Empire) Grand Duchy of Finland	The barque was wrecked in the Pentland Firth with the loss of seven of the nine people on board. She was on a voyage from Liverpool, Lancashire, United Kingdom to Vaasa.
Amelina	France	The schooner ran aground on the Newcombe Sand, in the North Sea off the coast of Suffolk, United Kingdom. She was on a voyage from Sunderland, County Durham, United Kingdom to Libourne, Gironde.
Ann	United Kingdom	The schooner struck the Blackwall Rock and sank in the River Thames at Blackwall, Middlesex. Her crew survived. She was refloated on 22 September and beached at Greenwich, Kent.
Ann	United Kingdom	The sloop was driven ashore and wrecked at Whitby, Yorkshire with the loss of her captain.
Nancy	United Kingdom	The ship ran aground off Helsingør, Denmark. She was on a voyage from Newcastle upon Tyne, Northumberland to Kronstadt, Russia. She was refloated on 22 September and resumed her voyage.
Rebecca	United Kingdom	The ship ran aground on the Pillhaken, in the Baltic Sea off the coast of Sweden. She was refloated and towed in to Landskrona.

== 17 September ==
List of shipwrecks: 17 September 1856
Ship	State	Description
Fredrich Wilhelm III	Sweden	The ship ran aground near "Furnsund". She was on a voyage from Stockholm to Sundsvall. She was refloated and put back to Stockholm for repairs.
Tanjore	United Kingdom	The ship ran aground in the Irrawaddy River 20 nautical miles (37 km) from its mouth. All on board were rescued. She was on a voyage from Rangoon, Burma to London.
Telegraph	Russia	The barque was driven ashore and wrecked at Swinemünde, Prussia.

== 18 September ==
List of shipwrecks: 18 September 1856
Ship	State	Description
Apprentice	(United Kingdom of Great Britain and Ireland) Victoria	The schooner was wrecked on East Hunter's Island. Her crew were rescued.
Lucien	United Kingdom	The brig was driven ashore near Höganäs, Sweden. She was on a voyage from Liverpool, Lancashire to Kronstadt, Russia. She was refloated on 21 September and taken in to Helsingør, Denmark.

== 19 September ==
List of shipwrecks: 19 September 1856
Ship	State	Description
Albion	United Kingdom	The ship ran aground in the Victoria Channel. She was on a voyage from Liverpool, Lancashire to Calcutta, India. She was refloated the next day and put back to Liverpool in a leaky condition.
Goldfinder	United Kingdom	The ship was in collision with West Derby (United Kingdom) and several other vessels and was then driven ashore on the Sangerall Sand, in the Hooghly River.

== 20 September ==
List of shipwrecks: 20 September 1856
Ship	State	Description
Alexander	United Kingdom	The ship was wrecked on Hogland, Russia. Her crew were rescued. She was on a voyage from St. Davids, Pembrokeshire to Saint Petersburg, Russia.
Confederation	United States	The ship ran aground on the Pluckington Bank, in the River Mersey. She was on a voyage from Liverpool, Lancashire, United Kingdom to Philadelphia, Pennsylvania. She was refloated then next day.
Genova	United Kingdom	The steamship ran aground on the Burbo Bank, in Liverpool Bay. She was on a voyage from Liverpool to Genoa, Kingdom of Sardinia. She was refloated and beached at Rock Ferry, Cheshire, United Kingdom. Again refloated on 22 September and taken in to Liverpool in a leaky condition.
Imogene	United Kingdom	The full-rigged ship was in collision with the steamship Falcon (United Kingdom) and sank in the Irish Sea 20 nautical miles (37 km) west of Holyhead, Anglesey. All on board were rescued by Falcon. Imogene was on a voyage from Liverpool to Pernambuco, Brazil.

== 21 September ==
List of shipwrecks: 21 September 1856
Ship	State	Description
Courrier du Maroc	France	The steamship was wrecked at Aber Wrac'h, Finistère. Her crew were rescued. She was on her maiden voyage, from Greenock, Renfrewshire, United Kingdom to Saint-Nazaire, Loire-Inférieure.
Imogene	United Kingdom	The ship was run into by Falcon (United Kingdom) and sank in the Irish Sea 20 nautical miles (37 km) west of Holyhead, Anglesey. Her crew were rescued by Falcon. Imogene was on a voyage from Liverpool, Lancashire to Pernambuco, Brazil.
Lady Ann	United Kingdom	The brig collided with the steamship Shannon (United Kingdom) and sank in the Gull Stream. Her crew were rescued by Shannon. Lady Ann was on a voyage from Blyth, Northumberland to Boulogne, Pas-de-Calais, France.
Margaret and Jane	United Kingdom	The ship was wrecked on the coast of Norway. Her crew were rescued.

== 22 September ==
List of shipwrecks: 22 September 1856
Ship	State	Description
Jessie Ann	United Kingdom	The brig was wrecked on the Goodwin Sands, Kent with the loss of a crew member. She was on a voyage from Dieppe, Seine-Inférieure, France to Whitby, Yorkshire.
Margaret	United Kingdom	The ship was wrecked on the Onrust Sandbank, off the Dutch coast. She was on a voyage from Sunderland, County Durham to Zierikzee, South Holland, Netherlands.
Mary Gray	United Kingdom	The barque was lost at sea near the Lofoten Islands, Norway. She was on a ballast voyage to Arkhangelsk, Russia. The crew reached Kristiansand

== 23 September ==
List of shipwrecks: 23 September 1856
Ship	State	Description
Charles	United Kingdom	The brig was driven ashore at Banff, Aberdeenshire. Her crew were rescued. She was on a voyage from Arkhangelsk, Russia to Aberdeen. She broke up on 27 September.
Hebe	Hamburg	The ship ran aground on the Haisborough Sands, in the North Sea off the coast of Norfolk, United Kingdom. Her crew took to a boat; they were subsequently rescued by Stranger (United Kingdom). Hebe was on a voyage from Plymouth, Devon to Middlesbrough, Yorkshire, United Kingdom.
Marian	United Kingdom	The brig was wrecked on the Goodwin Sands, Kent. Her crew were rescued by the Ramsgate Lifeboat.
Pallas	United Kingdom	The ship ran aground in the River Usk and was severely damaged. She was on a voyage from Newport, Monmouthshire to Waterford.
Sheraton	United Kingdom	The ship sank in the Dogger Bank. Her crew were rescued. She was on a voyage from Newcastle upon Tyne, Northumberland to Gothenburg, Sweden.
Viking	United Kingdom	The full-rigged ship was driven ashore and wrecked at "Ras-el-Mahmoura", Beylik of Tunis. Her crew were rescued but the ship was plundered by Arabs. She was on a voyage from Alexandria, Egypt to Falmouth, Cornwall or Queenstown, County Cork.
Vivid	United Kingdom	The sloop was driven ashore in the Bay of Étaples. Her crew were rescued.

== 24 September ==
List of shipwrecks: 24 September 1856
Ship	State	Description
Bartley	United Kingdom	The brig ran aground on the Goodwin Sands, Kent. Her crew were rescued by the Ramsgate Lifeboat. She was on a voyage from Southampton, Hampshire to Sunderland, County Durham. She was refloated and towed in to Ramsgate, Kent.
Britannia	United Kingdom	The ship was wrecked near Cape Breton Island, Nova Scotia, British North America.
Niagara	United States	Niagara, 8 June 2022. Carrying over 300 passengers on a voyage that had begun in Collingwood, Province of Canada, the 225-foot (69 m) palace steamer, a sidewheel paddle steamer, caught fire and sank in Lake Michigan 1 nautical mile (1.9 km; 1.2 mi) off the coast of Wisconsin just south of Belgium with the loss of more than 60 lives and all of her freight. Her survivors were rescued by the schooners Dan Marble and Pilot and the steamer Travelor (all United States). Her wreck lies in 55 feet (17 m) of water in the Wisconsin Shipwreck Coast National Marine Sanctuary at 43°29.31′N 087°46.490′W.
Queen	United Kingdom	The ship was driven ashore and wrecked at Cape Horn, Anticosti Island, Nova Scotia, British North America. She was on a voyage from Quebec City, Province of Canada, British North America to Hull, Yorkshire.
Volucia	United Kingdom	The ship ran aground on the Patch Sand, in the North Sea. She was refloated and taken in to Great Yarmouth, Norfolk in a leaky condition.
William Hyde	United Kingdom	The ship was driven ashore at Bluff Harbour, New Zealand. she had been refloated by 11 May 1857 and placed under repair.

== 25 September ==
List of shipwrecks: 25 September 1856
Ship	State	Description
Beagle	United Kingdom	The ship was driven onto rocks at Douglas, Isle of Man and was severely damaged. She was on a voyage from Liverpool, Lancashire to Londonderry. She was refloated the next day and taken in to Douglas.
Carnarvon Castle	United Kingdom	The ship was wrecked on the Kimmeridge Ledge, in the English Channel off the coast of Dorset. Her crew were rescued. She was on a voyage from Cherbourg, Seine-Inférieure, France to London.
Gustave	France	The steamship was driven ashore and wrecked at Lemvig, Denmark. She was on a voyage from Dunkirk, Nord to Saint Petersburg, Russia.
Helen Heilger, and Yeoman	United Kingdom	The ships collided in the Irish Sea 20 nautical miles (37 km) east south east of Ballycotton, County Down. Both vessels sank. Survivors - all 33 crew of Helen Heilger and three of the 23 crew of Yeoman - were rescued by York (United Kingdom). Helen Heilger was on a voyage from Calcutta, India to Liverpool. Yeoman outward bound from Liverpool.
William Cole	United Kingdom	The ship was driven onto the Sumatra Bank, in the Hooghly River. She was refloated the next day and taken in to Calcutta.

== 26 September ==
List of shipwrecks: 26 September 1856
Ship	State	Description
Brack	United Kingdom	The ship was wrecked on a reef off Borkum, Denmark. Her crew were rescued.
Dee	United Kingdom	The ship ran aground in Swansea Bay and was severely damaged. She was on a voyage from Hayle, Cornwall to Liverpool, Lancashire. Dee was subsequently taken in to Swansea, Glamorgan in a severely leaky condition.
Florence	(United Kingdom of Great Britain and Ireland) British North America	The schooner was driven ashore in the Gut of Canso. She was on a voyage from Richibucto, New Brunswick to Cork. She was refloated on 10 October and taken in to Arichat, Nova Scotia.
Harriet	United Kingdom	The smack was in collision with a Dutch brigantine and sank in the Firth of Clyde off The Cumbraes. Her crew survived.
Johanna	Bremen	The ship was lost off Cape Cerro, Brazil. Her crew were rescued. She was on a voyage from Iquique, Chile to Falmouth, Cornwall.
Monkey	United Kingdom	The coaster was driven ashore on the coast of Glamorgan and sank. Her crew were rescued. She was on a voyage from Newport, Monmouthshire to Liverpool.
Nimble	United Kingdom	The fishing smack was driven ashore and wrecked at Paignton, Devon.
Semaphore	United Kingdom	The steamship ran aground at Peel, Isle of Man. She was on a voyage from Belfast, County Antrim to Liverpool.
Wave	United Kingdom	The ship was driven ashore and sank at Swansea. She was on a voyage from Swansea to Portsmouth, Hampshire. She was refloated on 30 September and taken in to Swansea.

== 27 September ==
List of shipwrecks: 27 September 1856
Ship	State	Description
Ada	United Kingdom	The ship was damaged in Swansea Bay.
Amity	United Kingdom	The coaster was driven ashore on the coast of Glamorgan. Her crew were rescued.
Araby	United Kingdom	The brig was driven ashore and wrecked near Les Sables-d'Olonne, Vendée, France with the loss of four of her eight crew. She was on a voyage from Sunderland, County Durham to Bordeaux, Gironde.
Blenheim	United Kingdom	The steamship ran aground at Belfast, County Antrim. She was on a voyage from Belfast to Liverpool, Lancashire.
Bremen	United Kingdom	The schooner was driven ashore at Great Yarmouth, Norfolk.
Charlotte, and Friendship	(United Kingdom of Great Britain and Ireland) Guernsey; United Kingdom	The barque Charlotte was driven into the brig Friendship off Guernsey. Both vessels were severely damaged.
Christina	United Kingdom	The barque collided with the brig Père Rio (France) and was abandoned in the Bay of Biscay with the loss of a crew member. Survivors were rescued by Pere Rio. Christina was on a voyage from Palermo, Sicily to Liverpool.
Cora	United Kingdom	The schooner sprang a leak and was beached at Cromer, Norfolk.
Emmet	United Kingdom	The ship foundered in Swansea Bay. Her crew were rescued. She was refloated on 23 October.
Favourite	United Kingdom	The ship was severely damaged in Swansea Bay.
France	France	The steamship was destroyed by fire at Bahia, Brazil.
Gem	United Kingdom	The ship was driven ashore in Swansea Bay. She was refloated on 30 September.
Greenwell	United Kingdom	The ship ran aground on the Sheringham Shoals, in the North Sea off the coast of Norfolk. She was on a voyage from Sunderland to London. She was refloated and put in to Grimsby, Lincolnshire in a leaky condition.
Happy Return	United Kingdom	The ship foundered in Swansea Bay. Her crew were rescued.
Hilda	United Kingdom	The schooner was driven ashore and wrecked at Wexford with the loss of all but one of those on board.
Jeune Arthur	France	The brig was driven ashore and wrecked at Torquay, Devon, United Kingdom. She was on a voyage from Sunderland to Nantes, Loire-Inférieure.
J. W. Collingwood	United Kingdom	The brig capsized in the Atlantic Ocean with the loss of a crew member. Survivors were rescued on 6 October by Volga (United States). J. W. Collingwood was on a voyage from Quebec City, Province of Canada, British North America to Carmarthen. She came ashore at Loop Head, County Clare on 15 October and was wrecked.
Langarten	Danzig	The ship was driven ashore at Belfast. She was on a voyage from Quebec City to Belfast. She was refloated on 4 October.
Laurina Maria	Denmark	The ship was holed by her anchor and sank at Ramsgate, Kent, United Kingdom. She was on a voyage from Rouen, Seine-Inférieure, France to Copenhagen.
Lively Lass	United Kingdom	The ship sank in Swansea Bay. She was refloated on 30 September.
Meteor	United Kingdom	The ship was dismasted off Cape Finisterre, Spain with the loss of one life. She was driven ashore 3 nautical miles (5.6 km) from Loctudy, Finistère, France on 4 October. All 41 people on board survived. She was on a voyage from Bristol, Gloucestershire to Cardiff and Bombay, India. Meteor had been refloated by 5 November and towed in to L'Orient, Finistère.
Mona's Queen	(United Kingdom of Great Britain and Ireland) Isle of Man	The ship ran aground on the Burbo Bank, in Liverpool Bay. She was on a voyage from Wick, Caithness to Liverpool. She was refloated and put in to Ramsey, Isle of Man, where she was driven ashore and severely damaged. Mona's Queen was refloated on 29 September and taken in to Ramsey.
Monkey	United Kingdom	The schooner foundered in Swansea Bay. Her crew were rescued. She was on a voyage from Newport, Monmouthshire to Liverpool.
Pascoe Grenfell	United Kingdom	The barque was driven ashore in Swansea Bay.
Pioneer	United Kingdom	The brigantine foundered in Swansea Bay. Her crew were rescued.
Portland	United Kingdom	The ship foundered in the Irish Sea 40 nautical miles (74 km) south west of Holyhead, Anglesey. Her crew were rescued.
Saucy Lass	United Kingdom	The ship sank at Ramsgate. She was on a voyage from Newcastle upon Tyne, Northumberland to Dartmouth, Devon.
St. Aubin	United Kingdom	The ship departed from Milford Haven, Pembrokeshire for Bordeaux. No further trace, presumed foundered with the loss of all hands.
Stevens	United Kingdom	The ship ran aground off "Karington", Norway. Her crew were rescued. She was on a voyage from Wisbech, Cambridgeshire to Vyborg, Sweden.
Swiftsure	United Kingdom	The schooner was driven ashore in Swansea Bay. She was refloated on 30 September.
Western Star	United Kingdom	The schooner foundered in Swansea Bay. Her crew were rescued.

== 28 September ==
List of shipwrecks: 28 September 1856
Ship	State	Description
Alyth	United Kingdom	The brig foundered in the Atlantic Ocean (45°30′N 8°10′W). Her crew were rescued by the schooner Alberdina (Netherlands). Alyth was on a voyage from Barcelona, Spain to Swansea, Glamorgan.
Bella	United Kingdom	The sloop was driven ashore at Cromarty. She was on a voyage from Wick, Caithness to Newcastle upon Tyne, Northumberland.
Blue Bell	United Kingdom	The yacht was driven ashore and wrecked at Dublin.
Coral	United Kingdom	The schooner was driven ashore and wrecked at Holyhead, Anglesey. Her crew were rescued.
Coromandel	United Kingdom	The full-rigged ship was wrecked on the Ridge Sand, in the North Sea off the coast of Norfolk. She was later refloated and beached at Great Yarmouth, Norfolk.
Cygnet	United Kingdom	The yacht was driven ashore and wrecked at Dublin.
David	United Kingdom	The brig was abandoned off Great Yarmouth. Her crew were rescued. She was on a voyage from South Shields, County Durham to London. she was later taken in to Great Yarmouth.
Emmet	United Kingdom	The coaster was driven ashore on the coast of Glamorgan. Her crew were rescued.
Erin	United Kingdom	The yacht was driven ashore and wrecked at Kingstown.
Greyhound	United Kingdom	The schooner was driven ashore at Kingstown. She was on a voyage from Lisbon, Portugal to Drogheda, County Louth and/or the Isle of Man. Her six crew were rescued. She was refloated with assistance from the tug Liffey and towed in to Kingstown in a waterlogged condition.
Happy Couple	United Kingdom	The coaster was driven ashore on the coast of Glamorgan. Her crew were rescued. She was on a voyage from Newport, Monmouthshire to New Quay, Cardiganshire.
Higginson	United Kingdom	The barque was driven ashore and wrecked at Wicklow with the loss of a crew member. She was on a voyage from Quebec City, Province of Canada, British North America to Caernarfon.
Henri	France	The brigantine was driven ashore and wrecked at Dymchurch, Kent, United Kingdom with the loss of one of her seven crew. Survivors were rescued by the Coastguard.
Ida	United Kingdom	The steamship was driven ashore at Dymchurch with the loss of a crew member. She was on a voyage from London to the west coast of Africa.
Irene	United Kingdom	The brig was driven ashore and wrecked at Laytown, County Meath. Her crew were rescued by the Coast Guard. She was on a voyage from New Brunswick, British North America to Drogheda, County Louth.
Jean Marie	France	The ship was driven ashore and wrecked near Dover, Kent with the loss of a crew member. She was on a voyage from Sunderland, County Durham, United Kingdom to Nantes, Loire-Inférieure.
John and Mary	United Kingdom	The Yorkshire Billyboy was driven ashore and wrecked 4 nautical miles (7.4 km) west of Rye Harbour, Sussex with the loss of five lives. She was on a voyage from Caen, Calvados, France to London.
Magdaleine	(Denmark) Duchy of Schleswig	The yacht was driven ashore and wrecked at Sunderland. Her crew were rescued. She was on a voyage from Heilingenhafen to Newcastle upon Tyne.
Margaret	United Kingdom	The schooner was driven ashore at North Berwick, Lothian. She was on a voyage from Stettin to Grangemouth, Stirlingshire. She was refloated and taken in to North Berwick.
Martin	United Kingdom	The collier, a schooner, was driven onto rocks at Ballyholme, County Down and was wrecked with the loss of two of the six people on board. She was on a voyage from Maryport, Cumberland to Bangor, County Down.
Mary Ellen	United Kingdom	The sloop was driven ashore at "Canbyn", Anglesey. Her crew were rescued. She was on a voyage from Newcastle upon Tyne to Liverpool, Lancashire.
Mercury	United Kingdom	The ship was driven ashore and scuttled at Drogheda.
Nautilus	United Kingdom	The yacht was driven ashore and wrecked at Kingstown.
Parthian	United Kingdom	The ship was in collision with Hebe (United Kingdom) and was beached at Falsterbo, Sweden. She was on a voyage from Liverpool, Lancashire to Kronstadt, Russia. She was refloated on 30 September and taken in to Helsingør, Denmark in a severely leaky condition.
Pioneer	United Kingdom	The coaster was driven ashore on the coast of Glamorgan. Her crew were rescued.
Robert and Mary	United Kingdom	The smack was driven ashore at Dublin. Her crew were rescued by the Coastguard and police. She was on a voyage from Whitehaven, Cumberland to Drogheda.
Sarah	United Kingdom	The schooner was wrecked on the Milkmaid Bank, in Studland Bay. Her six crew were rescued by the steamship Contractor (United Kingdom). Sarah was on a voyage from Southampton, Hampshire to Newport.
Serenus	United Kingdom	The barque foundered in the Atlantic Ocean 320 nautical miles (590 km) off The Lizard, Cornwall (46°19′N 10°30′W). Her fourteen crew took to the longboat; they were rescued the next day by Meteor (United Kingdom). Serenus was on a voyage from Taganrog, Russia to Cork.
St. Mary	United Kingdom	The ship was driven ashore and wrecked at Wicklow. Her crew were rescued.
Tidy	United Kingdom	The coaster was driven ashore on the coast of Glamorgan. Her crew were rescued.
Usk	United Kingdom	The paddle steamer was driven into the barque Harriet Carr (United Kingdom and sank in the River Liffey.
Valentin	Rostock	The ship was driven ashore and wrecked at Wicklow. Her crew were rescued. She was on a voyage from Newcastle upon Tyne to Copenhagen, Denmark.
Wanderer	United Kingdom	The schooner was driven ashore and wrecked on Colt Island, County Dublin with the loss of all hands.

== 29 September ==
List of shipwrecks: 29 September 1856
Ship	State	Description
Aleksandriya (Александрия, 'Alexandria')	Imperial Russian Navy	The imperial steam yacht, with Emperor Alexander II on board, collided with the clipper Dzhigit (see below) at Kronstadt, with the loss of one of her crew.
Ann	United Kingdom	The ship was driven ashore at Goodwick, Pembrokeshire. She was on a voyage from Milford Haven to Cardigan. She was refloated on 3 October and taken in to Fishguard.
Brothers	United Kingdom	The ship was driven ashore and wrecked at Ballywater, County Down. Her crew were rescued. She was on a voyage from Kingstown, County Dublin to Whitehaven, Cumberland.
Dzhigit (Джигит)	Imperial Russian Navy	The clipper collided with the imperial steam yacht Aleksandriya (see above) at Kronstadt.
Economy	United Kingdom	The ship was driven ashore and wrecked at Breaksea Point, Glamorgan.
Jules et Armande	France	The ship was driven ashore near Blyth, Northumberland, United Kingdom.
Kirkland	United States	The ship was wrecked near Absecon, New Jersey.
Lord Raglan	United Kingdom	The ship was driven ashore on Spiteful Island, China. She was on a voyage from Foo Chow Foo to London.
Margaret	United Kingdom	The ship was driven ashore at Fishguard.
Milton	United Kingdom	The brig was wrecked on the North Gar, at the mouth of the River Tees. Her crew were rescued.
Proven	Duchy of Holstein	The ship was driven ashore at Spittal Point, Northumberland. Her crew were rescued.
Rosalie	United Kingdom	The ship was abandoned in the Atlantic Ocean. Her crew were rescued by Hansa (United Kingdom). Rosalie was on a voyage from Londonderry to Alexandria, Egypt.
Sarah Ann	United Kingdom	The ship was driven ashore at Harwich, Essex. She was on a voyage from Saint Petersburg, Russia to London.
Thomas Mason	United Kingdom	The ship was driven ashore and wrecked at Ballywater. Her crew were rescued. She was on a voyage from Bangor, County Down to Londonderry.
Venus	United Kingdom	The ship was driven ashore and wrecked in Aberayon Bay. Her crew were rescued.
Wild Duck	United States	The ship was driven ashore in the Min River. She was on a voyage from Foo Chow Foo to New York.

== 30 September ==
List of shipwrecks: 30 September 1856
Ship	State	Description
Charlotte Ann	France	The ship was driven ashore and damaged on the coast of Somerset, United Kingdom. She was on a voyage from Boulogne, Pas-de-Calais to Cádiz, Spain. She was refloated and taken in to Bridgwater, Somerset.
Chateaubriand	France	The ship was in collision with the barque Sylphde (Hamburg) and foundered. Seven crew were rescued by Fanny (United Kingdom), others took to a boat. Chateaubriand was on a voyage from Hull, Yorkshire to Algiers, Algeria.
Deutschland	Flag unknown	The ship was wrecked near Fredrikshavn, Denmark. She was on a voyage from Saint Petersburg, Russia to Kirkcaldy, Fife, United Kingdom.
Fanny	United Kingdom	The paddle steamer collided with the steamship Manx Fairy ( (United Kingdom of Great Britain and Ireland) Isle of Man) and sank at Monk's Ferry, Cheshire. She was on a voyage from Liverpool, Lancashire to Birkenhead, Cheshire. Fanny was refloated on 13 October and beached at Tranmere, Cheshire.
Hope	United Kingdom	The brig was abandoned in the Atlantic Ocean. Her crew were rescued by Mercurius (United Kingdom). Hope was on a voyage from Quebec City, Province of Canada, British North America to Dundee, Forfarshire.
Jane Scotland	United Kingdom	The ship was driven ashore in the River St. Charles.
Jennifer	United Kingdom	The ship was driven ashore and damaged on the coast of Somerset. She was refloated and taken in to Bridgwater.
Lizzie Aisbett	United Kingdom	The barque was abandoned in the Atlantic Ocean. She was on a voyage from Taganrog, Russia to Falmouth, Cornwall or Queenstown, County Cork. She was discovered derelict on 2 October by the steamship Calne (United Kingdom), which put seven crew aboard. She was taken in to Penzance, Cornwall, arriving on 7 October.

== Unknown date ==
List of shipwrecks: Unknown date in September 1856
Ship	State	Description
Alfredo	Portugal	The brig was scuttled in the Douro at Porto on the orders of the Board of Health in Lisbon on account of having been in port for more than two months and refusing to leave port when ordered to do so.
Aurora	United Kingdom	The ship was abandoned in the South Atlantic before 9 September.
Catao	Brazil	The brig collided with the full-rigged ship Raven (United States) and sank in the South Atlantic with the loss of 32 lives. She was on a voyage from Bahia to Rio de Janeiro.
Clarissa	United Kingdom	The barque was wrecked in the Sittang River before 8 September with the loss of seventeen of her crew.
Decarte	Portugal	The barque was scuttled in the Douro at Porto on the orders of the Board of Health in Lisbon on account of having been in port for more than two months and refusing to leave port when ordered to do so.
Diadem	United States	The ship foundered in the Atlantic Ocean with the loss of four of her crew.
Frogden	Flag unknown	The ship ran aground on the Neckmansground, in the Baltic Sea. Her crew were rescued by a British vessel. She subsequently floated off and was wrecked on Saaremaa, Russia before 2 September. She was on a voyage from Saint Petersburg, Russia to Stockholm, Sweden.
Heatherbell	United Kingdom	The ship ran aground on the Payana Shoals. She was on a voyage from Australia to Guayaquil, Ecuador. She was refloated a week later and resumed her voyage, arriving at Guayaquil on 12 September.
Hope	United Kingdom	The brig was abandoned in the Atlantic Ocean.
Industrie	United Kingdom	The ship foundered. She was on a voyage from Swansea, Glamorgan to Gibraltar.
Janet	United Kingdom	The ship foundered in the North Sea off Lindesnes, Norway before 29 September. Her crew were rescued. She was on a voyage from Newcastle upon Tyne to Copenhagen, Denmark.
Lightning	(United Kingdom of Great Britain and Ireland) New South Wales	The schooner was wrecked on Albany Island before 5 September. Twelve of seventeen crew were murdered by the local inhabitants. The survivors were rescued by Washington (Flag unknown).
Lima la Bruckareuse	Portugal	The barque was scuttled in the Douro at Porto on the orders of the Board of Health in Lisbon on account of having been in port for more than two months and refusing to leave port when ordered to do so.
Mary Worral	United Kingdom	The ship ran aground on the English Bank, in the River Plate. She was on a voyage from Liverpool to Montevideo, Uruguay. She was refloated on 7 September with assistance from HMS Rifleman (Royal Navy).
Monsoon	United Kingdom	The ship foundered off the Cape of Good Hope, Chile before 19 September. Her crew were rescued.
Phoenix	United Kingdom	The ship sprang a leak and was beached in the Bassein River before 8 September.
Rio Grande	United Kingdom	The ship sprang a leak whilst on a voyage from Calcutta, India to Sydney, New South Wales. She put in to Ramree, Burma, where she was repaired.
Rio Grande	United Kingdom	The ship sprang a leak and was beached on the coast of Burma. Her crew were rescued. She was on a voyage from Ramree to Sydney.
Sarah Jane	United Kingdom	The ship was driven ashore on the coast of Essex. She was refloated on 30 September and resumed her voyage.
Sara Johanna	Netherlands	The ship was wrecked 120 nautical miles (220 km) south of Ningpo, China with the loss of four of her crew. The wreck was plundered by pirates.
Sheridan Knowles	United Kingdom	The ship foundered off the Cape of Good Hope before 19 September. Her crew were rescued.
St. José	Brazil	The barque was scuttled in the Douro at Porto on the orders of the Board of Health in Lisbon on account of having been in port for more than two months and refusing to leave port when ordered to do so.
Thomas Barton	United Kingdom	The brig capsized in the Atlantic Ocean before 27 September.
Whitley Park	United Kingdom	The collier foundered in the English Channel before 2 September with the loss of all hands. She was on a voyage from the River Tyne to Havre de Grâce, Seine-Inférieure, France.
