= Menhir =

Large upright stone placed by humans

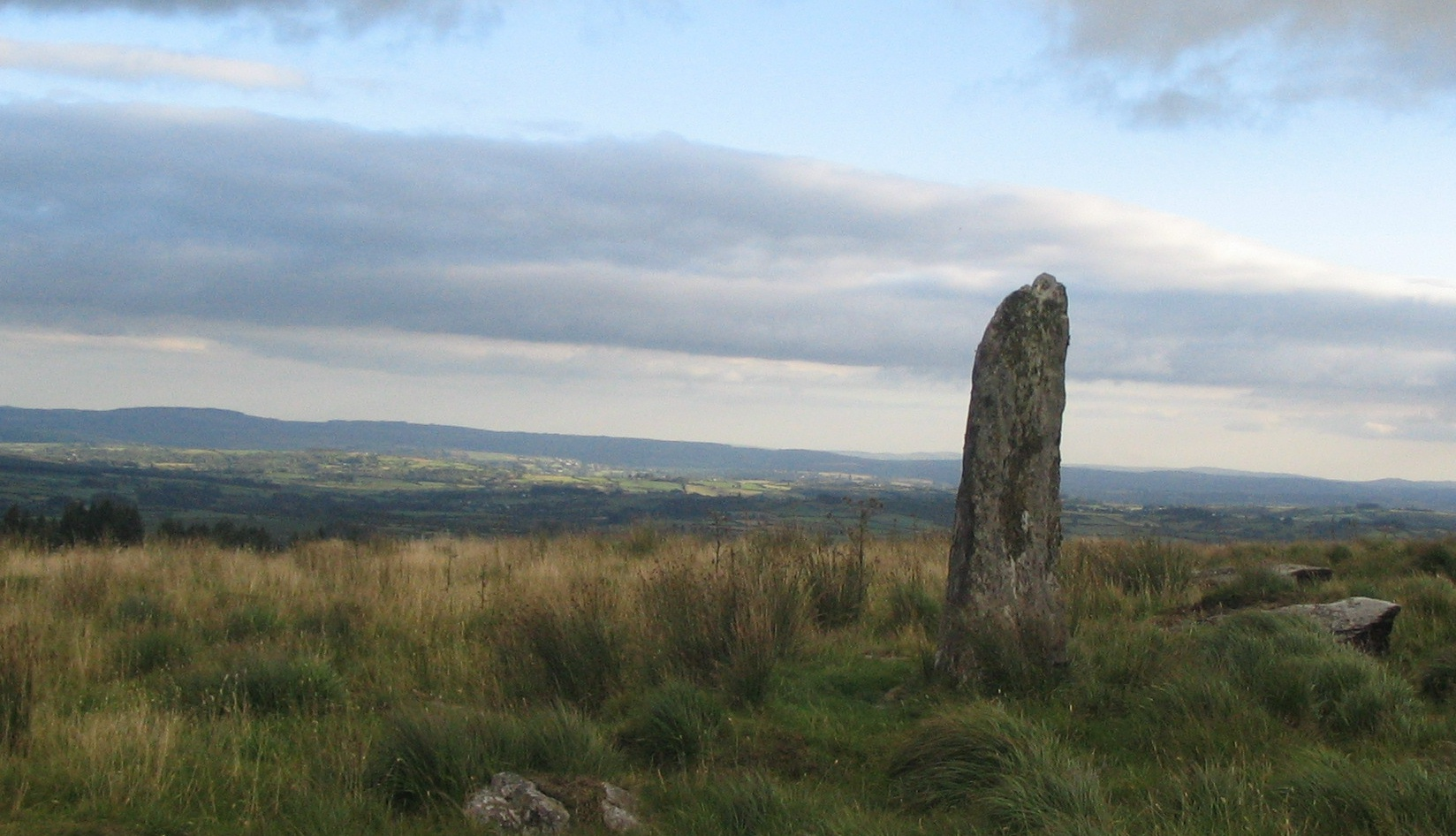
Large menhir located between Millstreet and Ballinagree, County Cork, Ireland

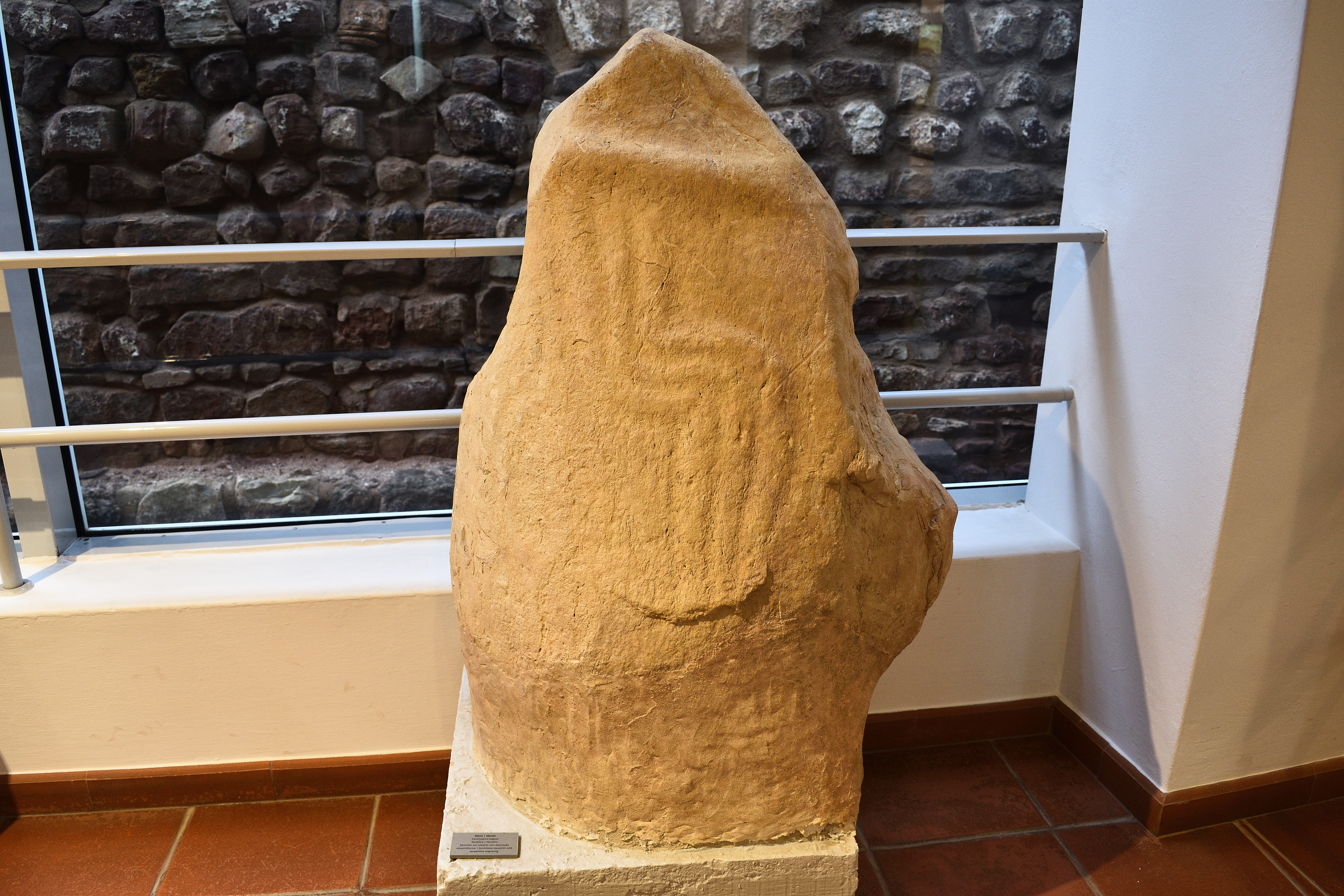
The Caramujeira Menhir, currently preserved at the Silves Municipal Archeology Museum, in Portugal

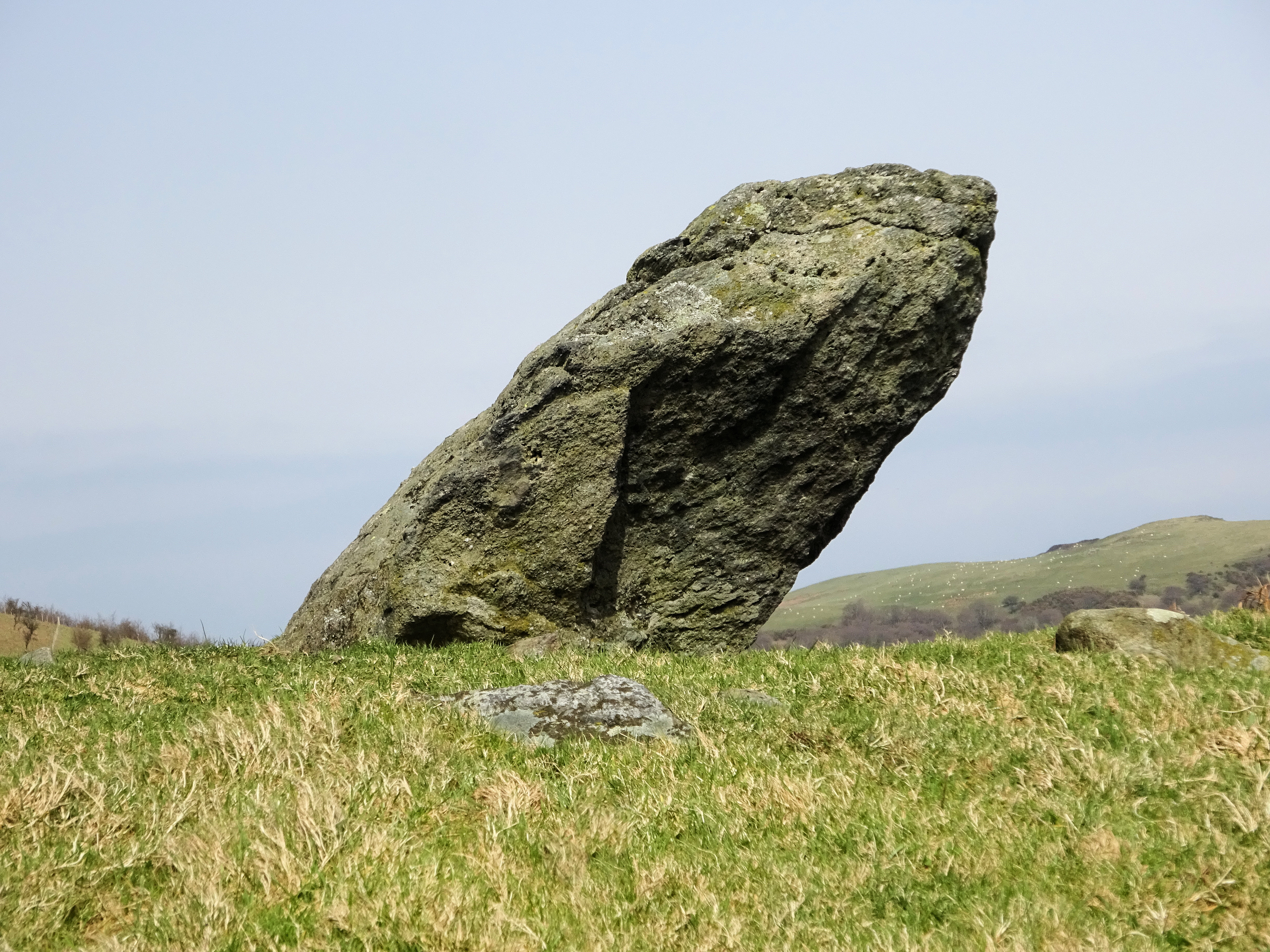
Cwm Rhaeadr Fawr maen hir (menhir) near Aber Falls, Gwynedd, Wales

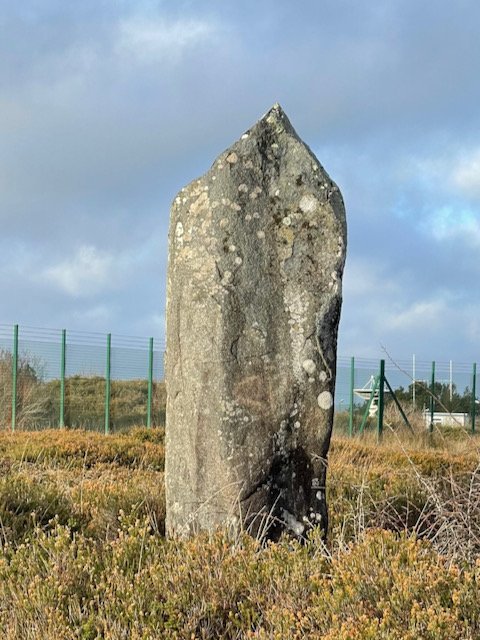
Dry Tree menhir – a standing stone at Goonhilly Downs, Cornwall

A menhir (/ˈmɛnhɪər/; from Brittonic languages: maen or men, "stone" and hir or hîr, "long"), standing stone, orthostat, or lith is a large upright stone, placed by humans, typically dating from the European middle Bronze Age. They can be found individually as monoliths, or as part of a group of similar stones. Menhirs' sizes can vary considerably, but they often taper toward the top.

Menhirs are found across Europe, Africa, and Asia, with a concentration in Western Europe, notably in Ireland, Great Britain, and Brittany. Theories concerning their purpose remain speculative, with hypotheses including rituals, territorial markers, and elements of an ideological system. Some menhirs feature engravings, including anthropomorphic figures and symbols, and are often associated with ancient religious ceremonies and burial chambers.

== Etymology ==
The word menhir was adopted from French by 19th-century archaeologists. The introduction of the word into general archaeological usage has been attributed to the 18th-century French military officer Théophile Corret de la Tour d'Auvergne. It is a combination of two words of the Breton language: maen and hir. In modern Welsh, they are described as maen hir, or "long stone". In modern Breton, the word peulvan is used, with peul meaning "stake" or "post" and van which is a soft mutation of the word maen which means "stone". In Germany and Scandinavia the word Bauta is used (German: Bautastein; Norwegian: bautastein) and this occasionally makes its way into English with the term "bauta stone".

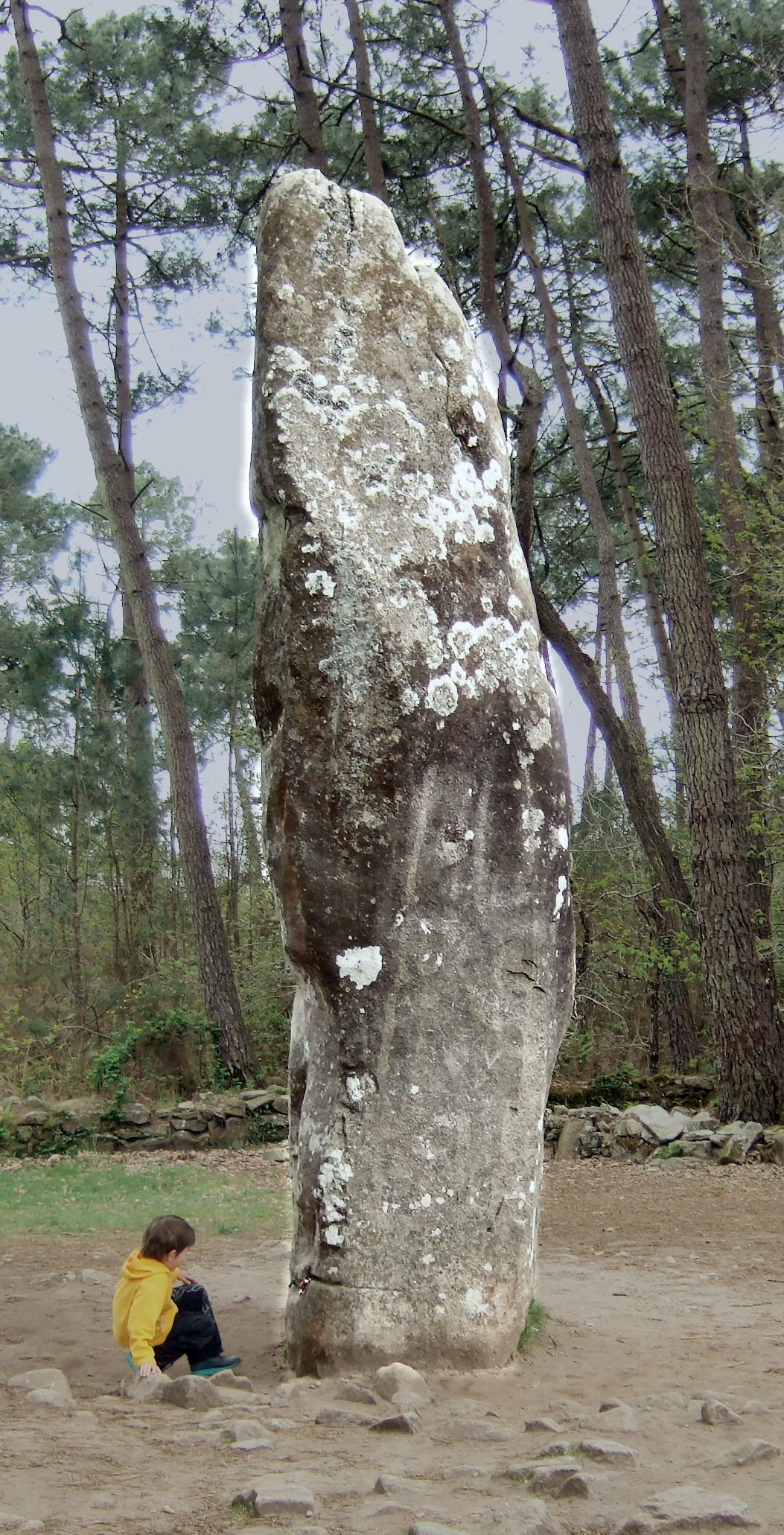
The Géant du Manio, a menhir in Carnac, Brittany

== History ==
Almost nothing is known of the social organization or religious beliefs of the people who erected the menhirs. Their language is also unknown. It is known, however, that they buried their dead and had the skills to grow crops, farm and make pottery, stone tools and jewelry. Identifying the purpose or use of menhirs remains speculative. Until recently, standing stones were associated with the Beaker people, who inhabited Europe during the European late Neolithic and early Bronze Age—later third millennium BC, c. 2800–1800 BC. However, recent research into the age of megaliths in Brittany strongly suggests a far older origin, perhaps back to six to seven thousand years ago.

Many menhirs are engraved with megalithic art, some with anthropomorphic features. Other common carvings are identified as images of stone axes, ploughs, shepherds' crooks, and yokes; and are named after these motifs. However, these identifications are not secure except for those of the stone axe images, and the names used to describe them are largely a matter of convenience. Some menhirs were broken up and incorporated into later passage graves, where they had new megalithic art carved with little regard for the previous pictures. It is not known if this re-use was deliberate or if the passage grave builders just saw menhirs as a convenient source of stone.

Where menhirs appear in groups, often in a circular, oval, henge, or horseshoe formation, they are sometimes called megalithic monuments. These are sites of ancient religious ceremonies, sometimes containing burial chambers. The exact function of menhirs has provoked more debate than practically any other issue in European prehistory. Over the centuries, they have variously been thought to have been used by druids for human sacrifice, used as territorial markers, or elements of a complex ideological system, used as mnemonic systems for oral cultures, or functioning as early calendars. Until the nineteenth century, antiquarians did not have substantial knowledge of prehistory, and their only reference points were provided by classical literature. The developments of radiocarbon dating and dendrochronology have significantly advanced scientific knowledge in this area.

== Geographical distribution ==
Menhirs are widely distributed across Europe, Africa, and Asia, but are most numerous in Western Europe; particularly in Ireland, Great Britain, and Brittany, where there are about 50,000 examples, and northwestern France, where there are some 1,200 further examples. Standing stones are usually difficult to date. They were constructed during many different periods across prehistory as part of the larger megalithic cultures in Europe and near areas. Some menhirs stand next to buildings that have an early or current religious significance. One example is the South Zeal Menhir in Devon, which formed the basis for a 12th-century monastery built by lay monks. The monastery later became the Oxenham Arms hotel, at South Zeal, and the standing stone remains in place in the snug bar at the hotel.

It is believed that practitioners of megalithic religions travelled via the sea, as the mass majority of menhirs are located on coasts, islands, and peninsulas.

== In popular culture ==
The French comic book series Asterix features the character Obelix, who is known for carrying menhirs, as a sculptor and deliveryman.

== See also ==
- Asherah pole – Canaanite sacred tree or pole honouring goddess
- Baetyl – Type of sacred standing stone
- Carlin stone – Name of many stones in Scotland
- Carnac stones – Set of megalithic sites in Brittany, France
- Ceremonial pole – Stake or post used in ritual practice
- Cove (standing stones) – Tight rectangular group of stones
- Cromlech – Ring of standing stones
- Deer stone – Megaliths found largely in Siberia and Mongolia
- Dolmen – Type of single-chamber megalithic tomb
- Fulacht fiadh – Burned mound from the Bronze Age in Ireland
- Gowk stane – Standing stones and glacial erratics in Scotland
- Henge – Type of Neolithic earthwork
- High place – 1st-millennium BCE Canaanite shrine
- Inuksuk – Inuit built stone landmark or cairn
- Kigilyakh – Natural tall rock pillars in Yakutia
- Ley line – Straight alignments between historic structures and landmarks
- List of individual rocks – Named rocks (not types of rock)
- List of largest monoliths
- Megalith – Large stone used to build a structure or monument
- Moai – Monolithic statues on Easter Island
- Napakivi – Standing stones in Finland
- Nature worship – Worship of nature spirits
- Obelisk – Tapered four-sided stone monument
- Obelix – Cartoon character in the French comic book series Asterix
- Orthostates – Man-made large stone slabs set in upright position
- Matzevah – Sacred pillar (in the Bible) or Jewish headstone. Also matzeva/mazzeva/maseba/masseba/massebah.
- Statue menhir – Standing stone carved into a human shape
- Stele – Stone or wooden slab erected as a marker
- Stone circle – Ring of standing stones
- Stone row – Linear row of standing stones. Also stone alignment.
- Stone ship – Stones set in the shape of a boat in north European burials. Also ship setting.
- Stone slab – Flat, thin, and big stone
- Trees in mythology – Significance of trees in religion and folklore
