= The Lizard =

Peninsula in southern Cornwall, England

Coordinates: 50°02′N 5°11′W

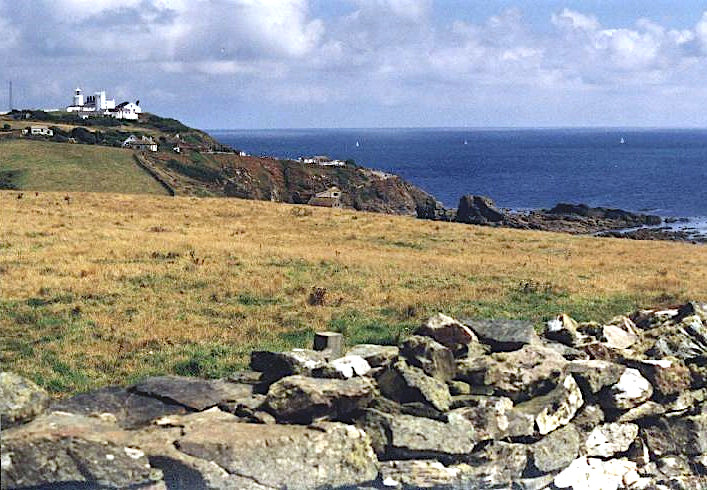
Lizard Point

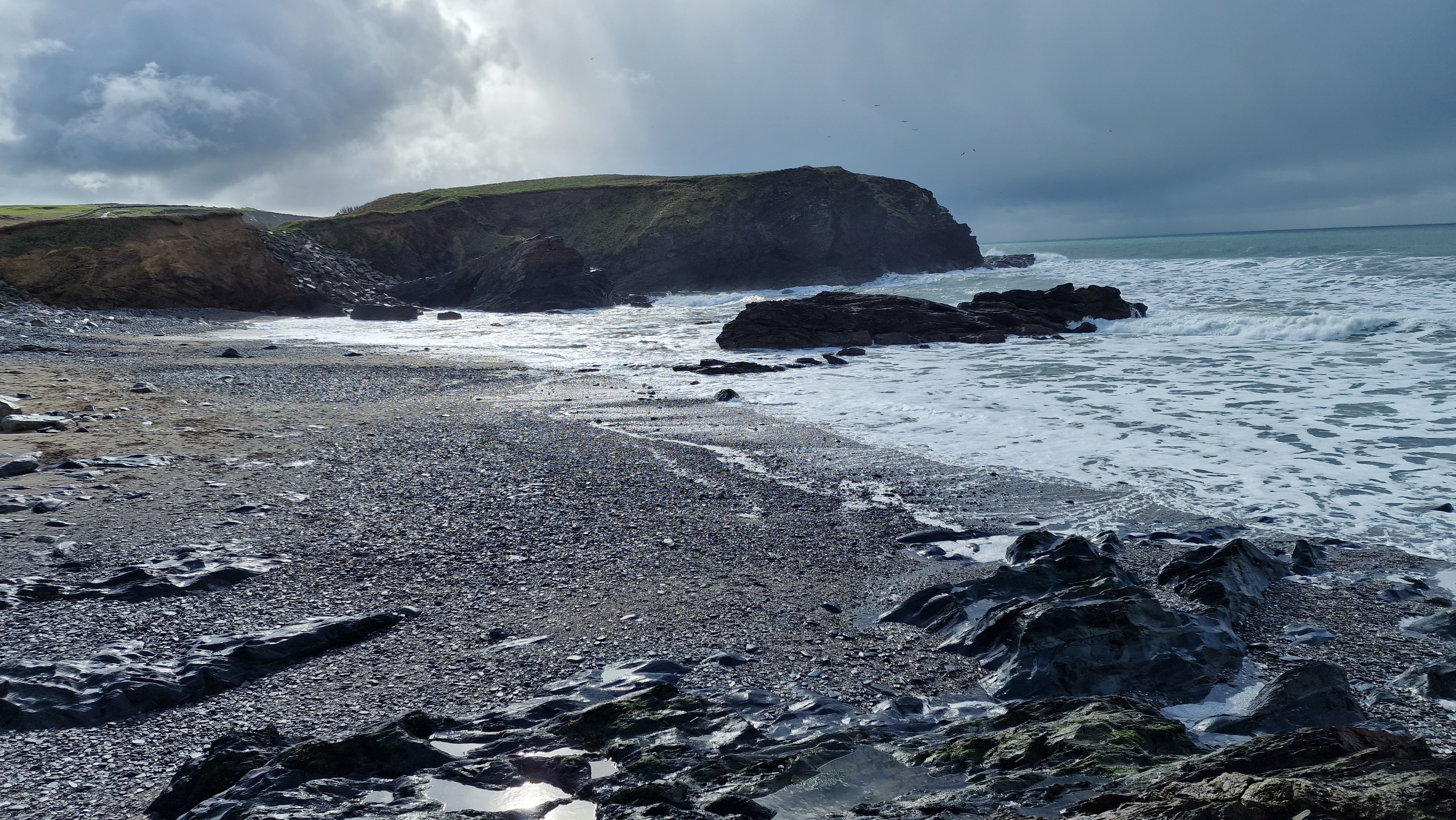
Rocky beach with crashing waves.

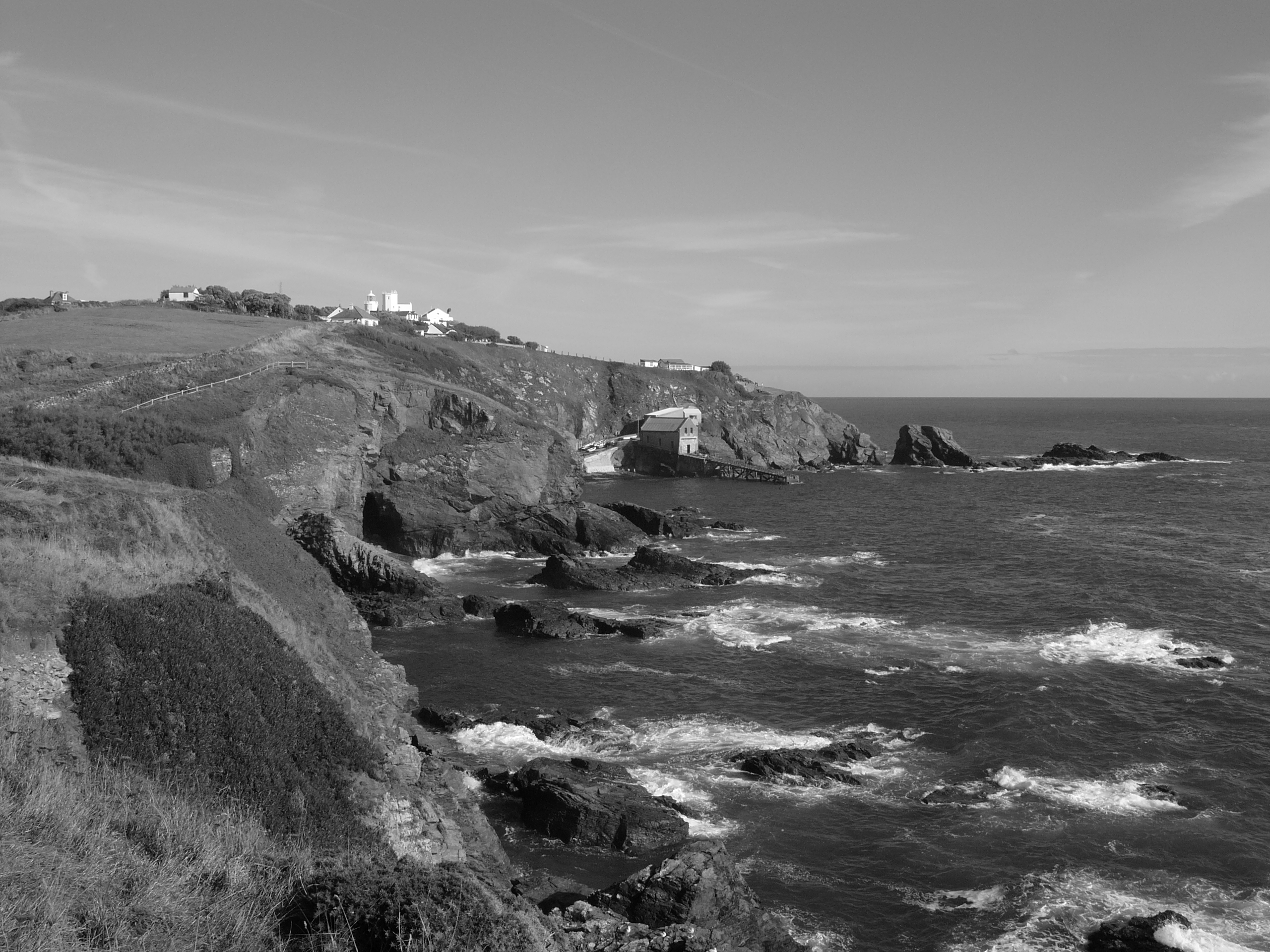
Lizard Point

The Lizard (Cornish: an Lysardh) is a peninsula in southern Cornwall, England, United Kingdom. The southernmost point of the British mainland is near Lizard Point at SW 701115; The Lizard, also known as Lizard village, is the most southerly region on the British mainland, and is in the civil parish of Landewednack. The valleys of the Helford River, and the lake known as Loe Pool form the northern boundary, with the rest of the peninsula surrounded by sea. The area measures about 14 by 14 miles (23 km × 23 km). The Lizard is one of England's natural regions and has been designated as a National Character Area 157 by Natural England. The peninsula is known for its geology and for its rare plants and lies within the Cornwall National Landscape, an Area of Outstanding Natural Beauty (AONB), also known as a National Landscape.

The Lizard's coast is particularly hazardous to shipping and the seaways round the peninsula were historically known as the "Graveyard of Ships". The Lizard Lighthouse was constructed at Lizard Point in 1752, and the RNLI operates The Lizard Lifeboat Station.

== Etymology ==
The name Lizard is most probably a corruption of the Cornish name Lys Ardh, meaning 'high court'; it is purely coincidental that much of the peninsula is composed of serpentinite-bearing rock. The peninsula's original name may have been the Celtic Bridanoc, from Britannakon ('the British one'), preserved in the name of the former village of Predannack, now site of Predannack Airfield.

== History ==
There is evidence of early habitation with several burial mounds and stones. Part of the peninsula is known as the Meneage (land of the monks).

Helston, the nearest town to the Lizard peninsula, is said to have once headed the estuary of the River Cober, before it was cut off from the sea by Loe Bar in the 13th century. It is speculated that Helston was once a port, but no records exist. Geomorphologists believe the bar was most likely formed by rising sea levels, after the last ice age, blocking the river and creating a barrier beach. The beach is formed mostly of flint and the nearest source is found offshore under the drowned terraces of the former river that flowed between England and France, and now under the English Channel. The medieval port of Helston was at Gweek, possibly from around 1260 onward, on the Helford River which exported tin and copper. Helston was believed to be in existence in the sixth century, around the River Cober (Dowr Kohar). The name comes from the Cornish "hen lys" or "old court" and "ton" added later to denote a Saxon manor; the Domesday Book refers to it as Henliston (which survives as the name of a road in the town). It was granted its charter by King John in 1201. It was here that tin ingots were weighed to determine the duty due to the Duke of Cornwall when a number of stannary towns were authorised by royal decree.

The royal manor of Winnianton, which was held by King William I at the time of the Domesday Book (1086), was also the head manor of the hundred of Kerrier and the largest estate in Cornwall. It was assessed as having fifteen hides before 1066. At the time of Domesday there was land for sixty ploughs, but in the lord's land there were two ploughs and in the lands held by villeins twenty-four ploughs. There were twenty-four villeins, forty-one freedmen, thirty-three smallholders and fourteen slaves. There was 6 acres (24,000 m^{2}), eight square leagues of pasture and half a square league of woodland. The livestock was fourteen unbroken mares, three cattle and one hundred and twenty-eight sheep (in total 145 beasts); its value was £12 annually. 11 of the hides were held by the Count of Mortain and there is more arable and pasture and 13 more persons are recorded: Rinsey, Trelowarren, Mawgan-in-Meneage and seventeen other lands are also recorded under Winnianton.

Mullion has the 15th century church of St Mellanus, and the Old Inn from the 16th century. The harbour was completed in 1895 and financed by Lord Robartes of Lanhydrock as a recompense to the fishermen for several disastrous pilchard seasons.

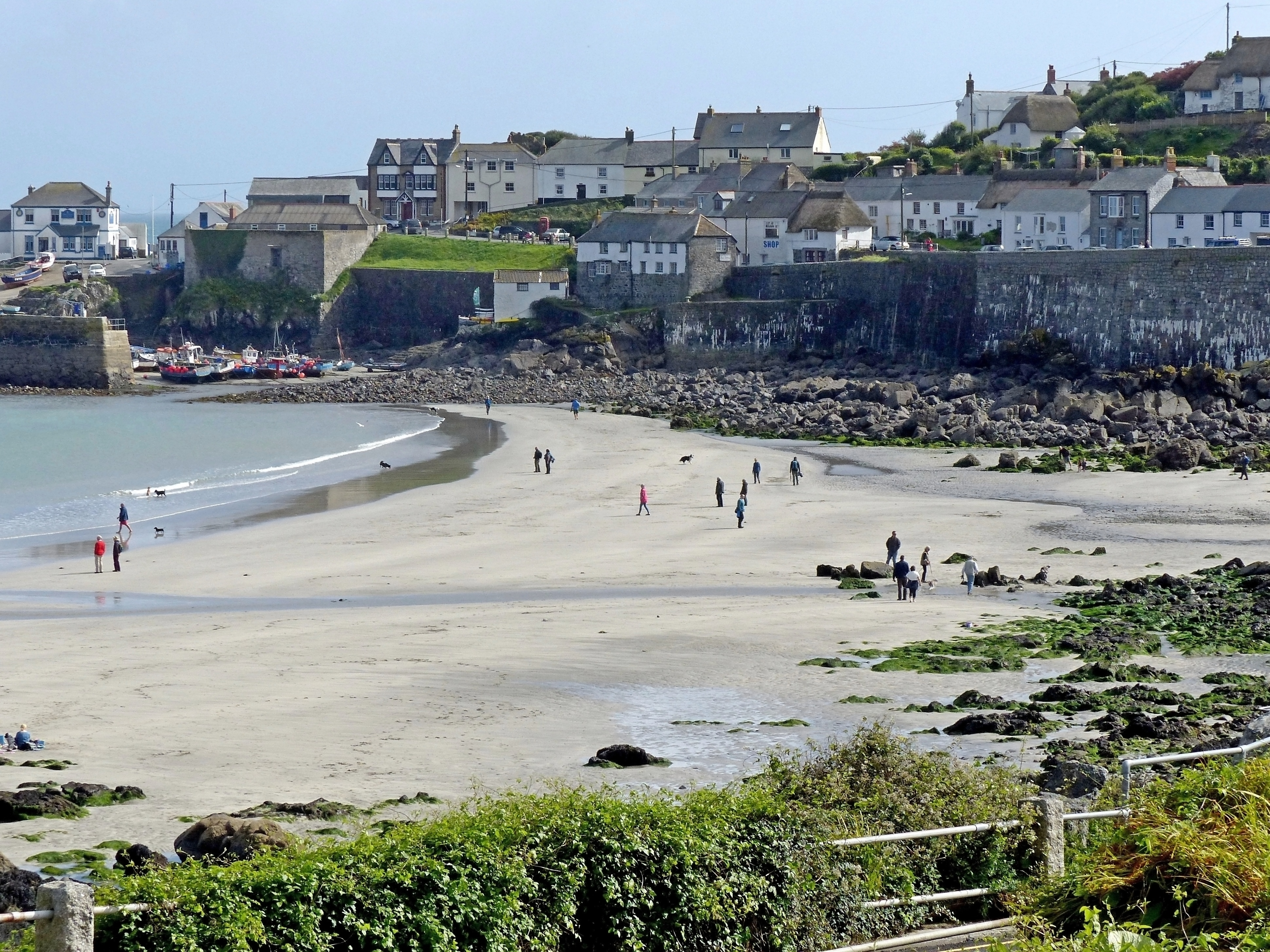
Coverack is a coastal village on the eastern side of the Lizard (2017)

The small church of St Peter in Coverack, built in 1885 for £500, has a serpentinite pulpit.

The Great Western Railway operated a road motor service to the Lizard from Helston railway station. Commencing on 17 August 1903, it was the first successful British railway-run bus service and was initially provided as a cheaper alternative to a proposed light railway.

The Solar eclipse of 11 August 1999 departed the UK mainland from the Lizard.

The transatlantic record run of the unaccompanied one hand sailor Thomas Coville within less than 5 days in his sailboat Sodebo Ultim from New York to Europe landed here on 15 July 2017.

=== Nautical ===
The Lizard has been the site of many maritime disasters. It forms a natural obstacle to entry and exit of Falmouth and its naturally deep estuary. At Lizard Point stands the Lizard Lighthouse, where a light was erected by Sir John Killigrew at his own expense. It was built at the cost of "20 nobles a year" for 30 years, and caused many problems over the following years, as King James I considered charging vessels to pass. Thus, the lighthouse was demolished. It was rebuilt in 1751 by order of Thomas Fonnereau and remains almost unchanged today. Further east lie The Manacles, near Porthoustock: 1 1/2 square miles (4 km^{2}) of jagged rocks just beneath the waves.

- In 1721 the Royal Anne Galley, an oared frigate, was wrecked at Lizard Point. Of a crew of 185 only three survived; lost was Lord Belhaven who was en route to take up the Governorship of Barbados.
- A 44-gun frigate, HMS Anson, was wrecked at Loe Bar in 1807. Although it wrecked close to shore, many lost their lives in the storm. This inspired Henry Trengrouse to invent the rocket-fired line, later to become the Breeches buoy.
- The transport ship Dispatch ran aground on the Manacles in 1809 on its return from the Peninsular War, losing 104 men from the 7th Hussars. The following day, with local villagers still attempting a rescue, the brig-sloop HMS Primrose hit the northern end of these rocks. The only survivor of its 126 officers, men and boys was a drummer boy.
- On 5 September 1856 the Cherubim and Ocean Home collided off Lizard Point
- The SS Mohegan, a 6,889 GRT passenger liner, also hit the Manacles in 1898 with the loss of 106 lives.
- The American passenger liner Paris was stranded on the Manacles in 1899, with no loss of life.

The biggest rescue in the RNLI's history was 17 March 1907 when the 12,000-tonne liner SS Suevic hit the Maenheere Reef near Lizard Point in Cornwall. In a strong gale and dense fog RNLI lifeboat volunteers rescued 456 passengers, including 70 babies. Crews from the Lizard, Cadgwith, Coverack and Porthleven rowed out repeatedly for 16 hours to rescue all of the people on board. Six silver RNLI medals were later awarded, two to Suevic crew members.

The Battle at the Lizard, a naval battle, took place off the Lizard on 21 October 1707.

Smuggling was a regular, and often necessary, way of life in these parts, despite the efforts of coastguards or "Preventive men". In 1801, the king's pardon was offered to any smuggler giving information on the Mullion musket men involved in a gunfight with the crew of HM Gun Vessel Hecate.

=== Aeronautical ===
In the First World War a Naval Air Station, RNAS Mullion, was established at Bonython, flying mainly blimps used for spotting U-boats. One was sunk and several probably damaged by bombs dropped by the blimps. The airfield site is now occupied by the wind farm.

RAF Predannack was a Second World War airbase, from which Coastal Command squadrons flew anti-submarine sorties into the Bay of Biscay as well as convoy support in the western English Channel. The runways still exist and the site is used by a local Air Cadet Volunteergliding Squadron 626VGS and as an emergency/relief base for RNAS Culdrose (HMS Seahawk).

RNAS Culdrose is Europe's largest helicopter base, and currently hosts the Training and Operational Conversion Unit operating the EH101 "Merlin" helicopter. It is also the home base for Merlin Squadrons embarked upon Royal Navy warships, the Westland Sea King airborne early warning (AEW) variant helicopter, a Search And Rescue (Sea King, again) helicopter flight, and some BAe Hawk T.1 trainer jets used for training purposes by the Royal Navy. The base also operates some other types of fixed wing aircraft for calibration and other training purposes. As befits the base's name, a non-flying example of a Hawker Sea Hawk forms the main gate guardian static display. RNAS Culdrose is a major contributor to the economy of the Lizard area.

=== Political ===
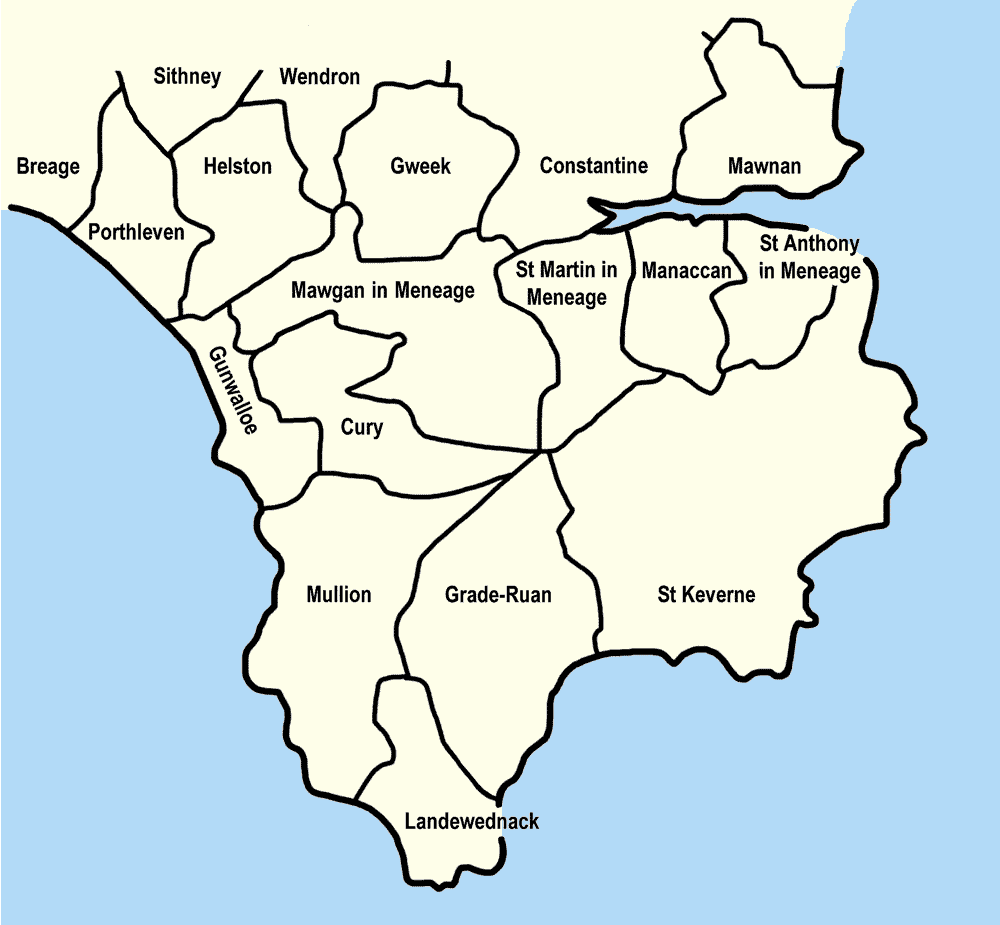
Sketchmap of civil parishes on the Lizard

The Lizard peninsula is in the St Ives parliamentary constituency, which comprises the whole of the former district of Penwith and the southern part of the former district of Kerrier). The parishes northeast of the river Helford are in Camborne and Redruth parliamentary constituency

To the north, the Lizard peninsula is bordered by the civil parishes of Breage, Porthleven, Sithney, Helston, Wendron, Gweek and – across the Helford River – by Constantine, Kerrier and Mawnan.

The parishes on the peninsula proper are (west to east):

- Northern parishes:
  - Gunwalloe
  - Cury
  - Mawgan-in-Meneage
  - St Martin-in-Meneage
  - Manaccan
  - St Anthony-in-Meneage
- Southern parishes:
  - Mullion
  - Grade-Ruan
  - St Keverne
  - Landewednack

The Lizard's political history includes the 1497 Cornish rebellion which began in St Keverne. The village blacksmith Michael Joseph (Michael An Gof in Cornish, meaning blacksmith) led the uprising, protesting against the punitive taxes levied by Henry VII to pay for the war against the Scots. The uprising was routed on its march to London and the two leaders, Michael Joseph and Thomas Flamank, were subsequently hanged, drawn and quartered.

=== Technological ===
Titanium was discovered here by the Reverend William Gregor in 1791.

In 1869, John Pender formed the Falmouth Gibraltar and Malta Telegraph company, intending to connect India to England with an undersea cable. Although intended to land at Falmouth, the final landing point was Porthcurno near Land's End.

In 1900, Guglielmo Marconi stayed at the Housel Bay Hotel in his quest to locate a coastal radio station to receive signals from ships equipped with his apparatus. He leased a plot "in the wheat field adjoining the hotel" where the Lizard Wireless Telegraph Station still stands today. Recently restored by the National Trust, it looks as it did in January 1901, when Marconi received the distance record signals of 186 miles (299 km) from his transmitter station at Niton, Isle of Wight. The Lizard Wireless Station is the oldest Marconi station to survive in its original state, and is located to the west of the Lloyds Signal Station in what appears to be a wooden hut. On 12 December 1901 Marconi's Poldhu Wireless Station at Poldhu Point was the site of the first trans Atlantic, wireless signal radio communication when Marconi sent a signal to St John's, Newfoundland. The technology is one of the key advances to the development of radio, television, satellites and the internet.

An early-warning radar station called RAF Dry Tree was built on Goonhilly Downs during World War II. The site was later chosen for the Telstar project in 1962; its rocky foundations, clear atmosphere and extreme southerly location being uniquely suitable. This became the Goonhilly Satellite Earth Station, now owned by Goonhilly Earth Station Ltd. Some important developments in television satellite transmission were made at Goonhilly station. A wind farm exists near to the Goonhilly station site.

== Geology ==
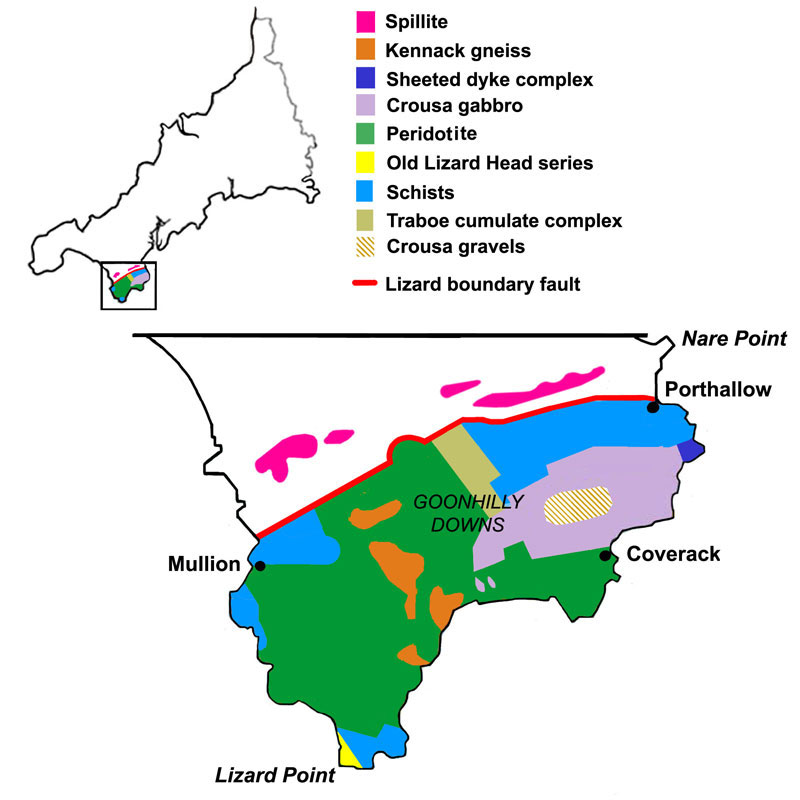
Sketchmap of the Lizard geology

Known as the Lizard complex, the peninsula's geology is the best preserved example of an exposed ophiolite in the United Kingdom.

An ophiolite is a suite of geological formations which represent a slice through a section of ocean crust (including the upper level of the mantle) thrust onto the continental crust.

The Lizard formations comprise three main units; the serpentinites, the "oceanic complex" and the metamorphic basement. The serpentinite contains significant samples of the serpentine polymorph lizardite, which were named after the Lizard complex in 1955.

== Ecology ==
Several nature sites exist on the Lizard Peninsula; Predannack nature reserve, Mullion Island, Goonhilly Downs, and the Cornish Seal Sanctuary at Gweek. An area of the Lizard covering 16.62 square kilometres (6.42 sq mi) is designated a national nature reserve because of its coastal grasslands and heaths and inland heaths. The peninsula contains 3 main Sites of Special Scientific Interest (SSSI), both noted for their endangered insects and plants, as well as their geology. The first is East Lizard Heathlands SSSI, the second is Caerthillian to Kennack SSSI and the third is West Lizard SSSI, of which the important wetland, Hayle Kimbro Pool, forms a part of.

The area is also home to one of England's rarest breeding birds — the Cornish chough. This species of corvid is distinctive due to its red beak and legs and haunting "chee-aw" call. Choughs were extinct in Cornwall but returned naturally in 2001 and began breeding on Lizard in 2002 following a concerted effort by the National Trust, English Nature and the RSPB.

The Lizard contains some of the most specialised flora of any area in Britain, including many Red Data Book plant species. Of particular note is the Cornish heath, Erica vagans, that occurs in abundance here, but which is found nowhere else in Britain. There are more than 600 species of flowering plants on the Lizard, nearly a quarter of all UK species. The reason for this richness is partly because of the many different and unusual Lizard rocks on the Lizard Peninsula. Each habitat, with its own combination of factors, attracts its own specialist plants. It is also one of the few places where the rare formicine ant, Formica exsecta, (the narrow-headed ant), can be found.

== In pop culture ==
Daphne du Maurier based many novels on this part of Cornwall, including Frenchman's Creek.

The Lizard was featured on the BBC television programme Seven Natural Wonders as one of the wonders of the South West, and on the BBC series Coast.

The Jennifer McQuiston 2015 novel The Spinster's Guide to Scandalous Behavior is set primarily in the fictional village Lizard Bay on the Lizard in the mid-nineteenth century.

"Lizard Point" is also a track on the 1982 album Ambient 4: On Land released by Brian Eno.

The book series "Fenton House" by Ben Cheetham is set on the Lizard Peninsula.

== See also ==
- Kynance Cove
- Mullion Cove
- Poldhu
