= Goonhilly Downs =

Site of Special Scientific Interest in Cornwall, England

Goonhilly Downs Goon Helghi (Cornish)
- Site of Special Scientific Interest
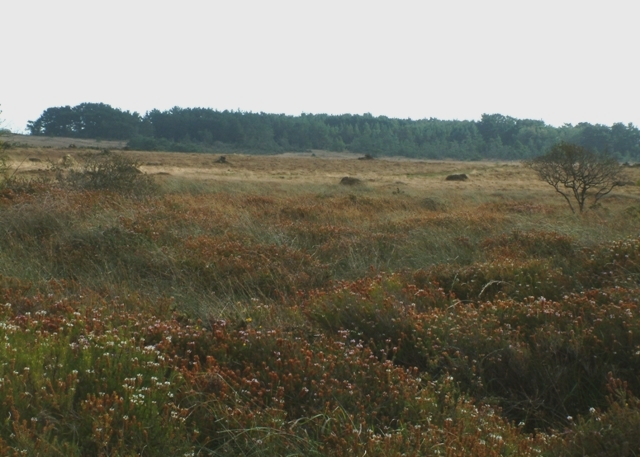
- Goonhilly Downs

- Location within Cornwall Location within England
- Location of Goonhilly Downs Goon Helghi (Cornish).
- Area of search: Cornwall
- Grid reference: SW720200
- Coordinates: 50.0394°N 5.1709°W
- Interest: Biological
- Area: 1,271 hectares (12.7 km^{2}; 4.91 sq mi)
- Notification date: 1951

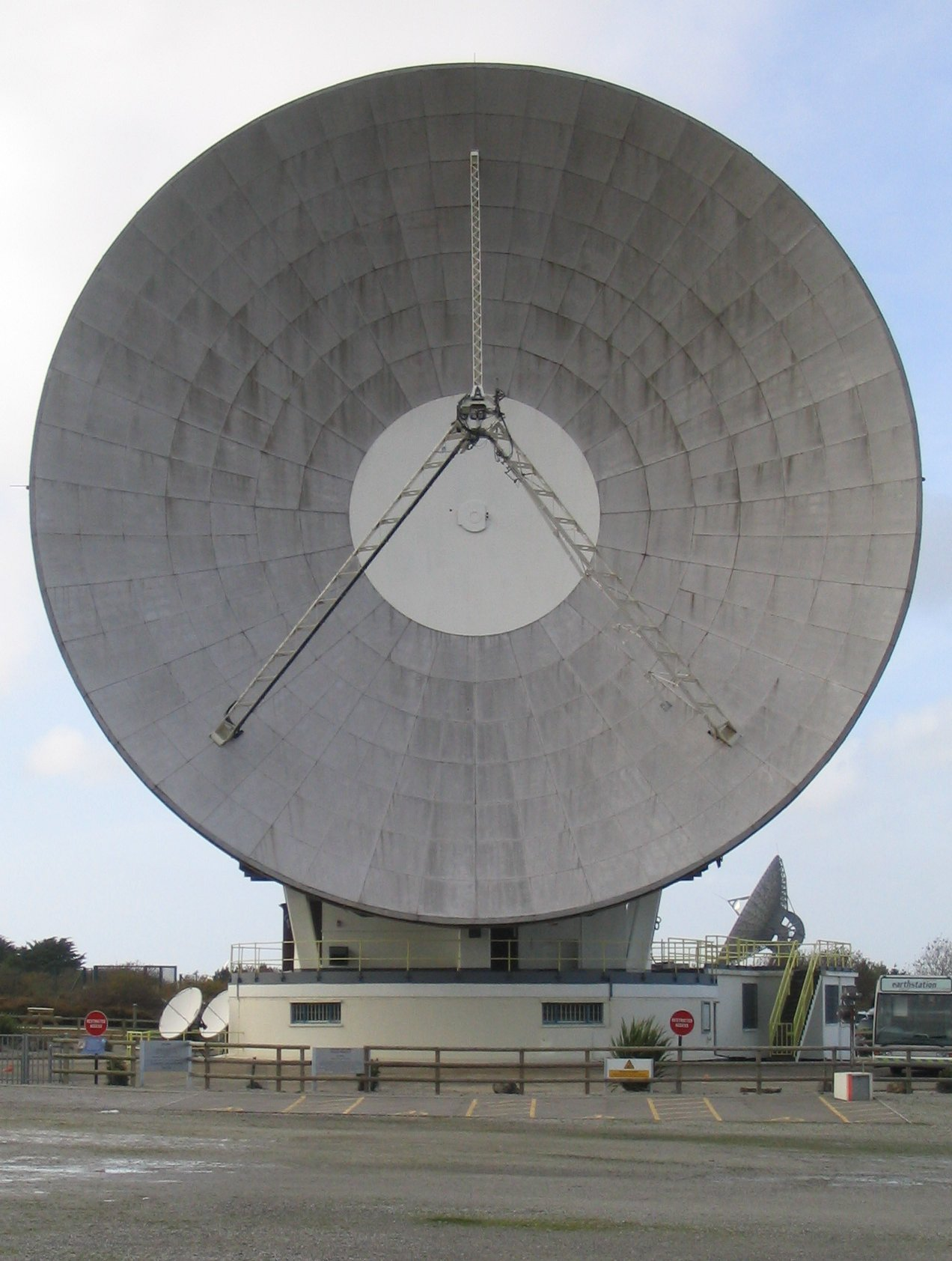
Arthur the oldest telecommunication dish at Goonhilly Satellite Earth Station, on the Downs

Goonhilly Downs (Cornish: Goon Helghi, meaning hunting moorland) is a Site of Special Scientific Interest (SSSI) that forms a raised plateau in the central western area of the Lizard peninsula in southern Cornwall, England. It is one of 229 English national nature reserves designated by Natural England with an area of almost 1,270 hectares.

== Features ==
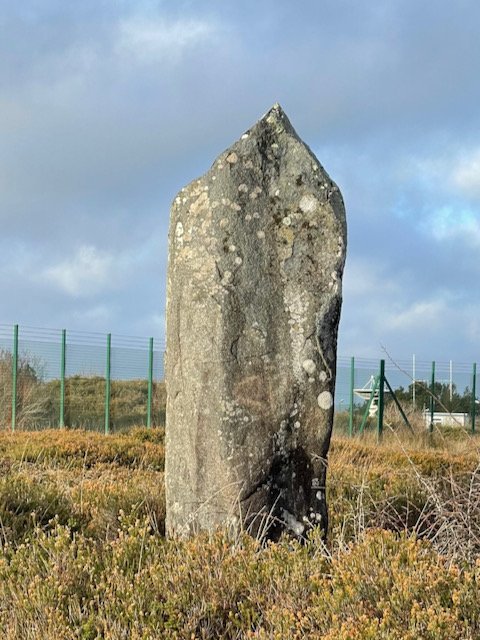
Dry Tree menhir - a standing stone at Goonhilly Downs

Situated just south of Helston and the Royal Naval Air Station RNAS Culdrose, the Goonhilly Downs are famous for being the location of the Goonhilly Satellite Earth Station, at one time the largest in the world. The huge satellite dishes are an iconic landmark, and can be seen for miles. The downs themselves are largely an area of sparse heathland, based on serpentinite geology. The site for the satellite station was chosen since the serpentine rock base could bear the weight of the heaviest of satellite dish.

Goonhilly Downs is also home to a 12 megawatt wind farm consisting of six wind turbines each of two megawatts.

This is home to rare plants, such as Cornish heath, which has been adopted as the county flower. A forested area of the downs is known as Croft Pascoe and this larger area includes the Croft Pascoe Pool.

A large standing stone known as the Dry Tree menhir can be found on the ex-RAF Dry Tree site on the downs. RAF Dry Tree was used during the Second World War, and is near to the satellite station.

The name Goonhilly comes from the Cornish language, and means "hunting downs", from goon, "down, moor", and helghi, "to hunt". (See "Cornish place names translated".)

=== Part of Lizard SAC ===
Goonhilly Downs is one of six Special Areas of Conservation (SAC) that form the almost 3,086 hectares of the Lizard SAC. The others, all SSSIs are Baulk Head to Mullion, Caerthillian to Kennack Sands, Coverack to Porthoustock, Kennack to Coverack, and Mullion Cliff to Predannack Cliff.

Approached from the Helston direction and half a mile before the Satellite dishes is the former Goonhilly Craft Shop and Tea Room, now converted to a private dwelling. Set back from the road, the building was constructed in the early 1960s by a local farmer. The land was originally part of the nearby Trelowarren estate. Planning permission was granted to build a 4-bedroomed bungalow and petrol station/garage known locally as 'Telstar'; (Telstar is the name of various communications satellites, including the first ever such satellite able to relay television signals.) 'Telstar Cafe' used to have a petrol station but petrol is now sold at Helston supermarket garages. 100,000 people a year visited BT's nearby FutureWorld@Goonhilly (now closed) and many of them also called into the Craft Shop and Tea Room before making their way back from Goonhilly.

Goonhilly Downs also serves as a landing point for the SEA-ME-WE 3, the longest submarine cable on Earth.

Nearer to Mullion are other triple SIs including the North Predannack Downs Nature Reserve, owned and managed by the Cornwall Wildlife Trust. This reserve is prime Cornish heath (Erica vagans) with ponds and willow fen. Early Bronze Age barrows are present, and there are several ancient 'turf-hut' circles. There are remains of buildings which were part of RAF Dry Tree and later RAF Trelanvean, used during the Second World War. Both the adder – a venomous snake, and the European stonechat – a passerine bird are commonly sighted here.

== See also ==
- Geology of Lizard, Cornwall
- List of topics related to Cornwall
- Wind power in the United Kingdom
