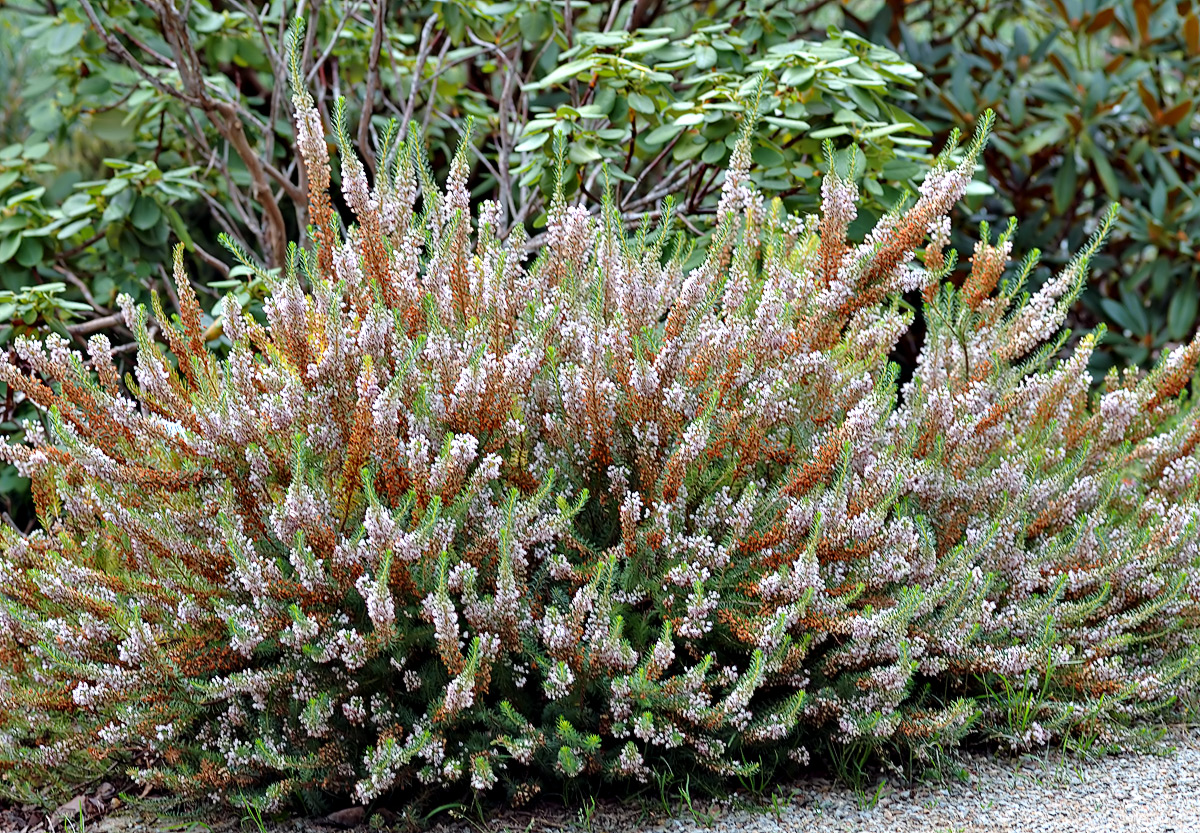

Conservation status
- Least Concern (IUCN 3.1)

Scientific classification
- Kingdom: Plantae
- Clade: Tracheophytes
- Clade: Angiosperms
- Clade: Eudicots
- Clade: Asterids
- Order: Ericales
- Family: Ericaceae
- Genus: Erica
- Species: E. vagans

Binomial name
- Erica vagans L.

= Erica vagans =

Species of flowering plant

Erica vagans, the Cornish heath or wandering heath, is a species of flowering plant in the family Ericaceae, native to Ireland, Cornwall, western France and Spain. It is a vigorous, spreading, evergreen heather reaching 75 cm (30 in) tall and wide, with pink flowers borne in racemes 14 cm (6 in) long in summer and autumn. The Latin specific epithet vagans literally means "wandering"; in this context it means "widely distributed".

== Description ==
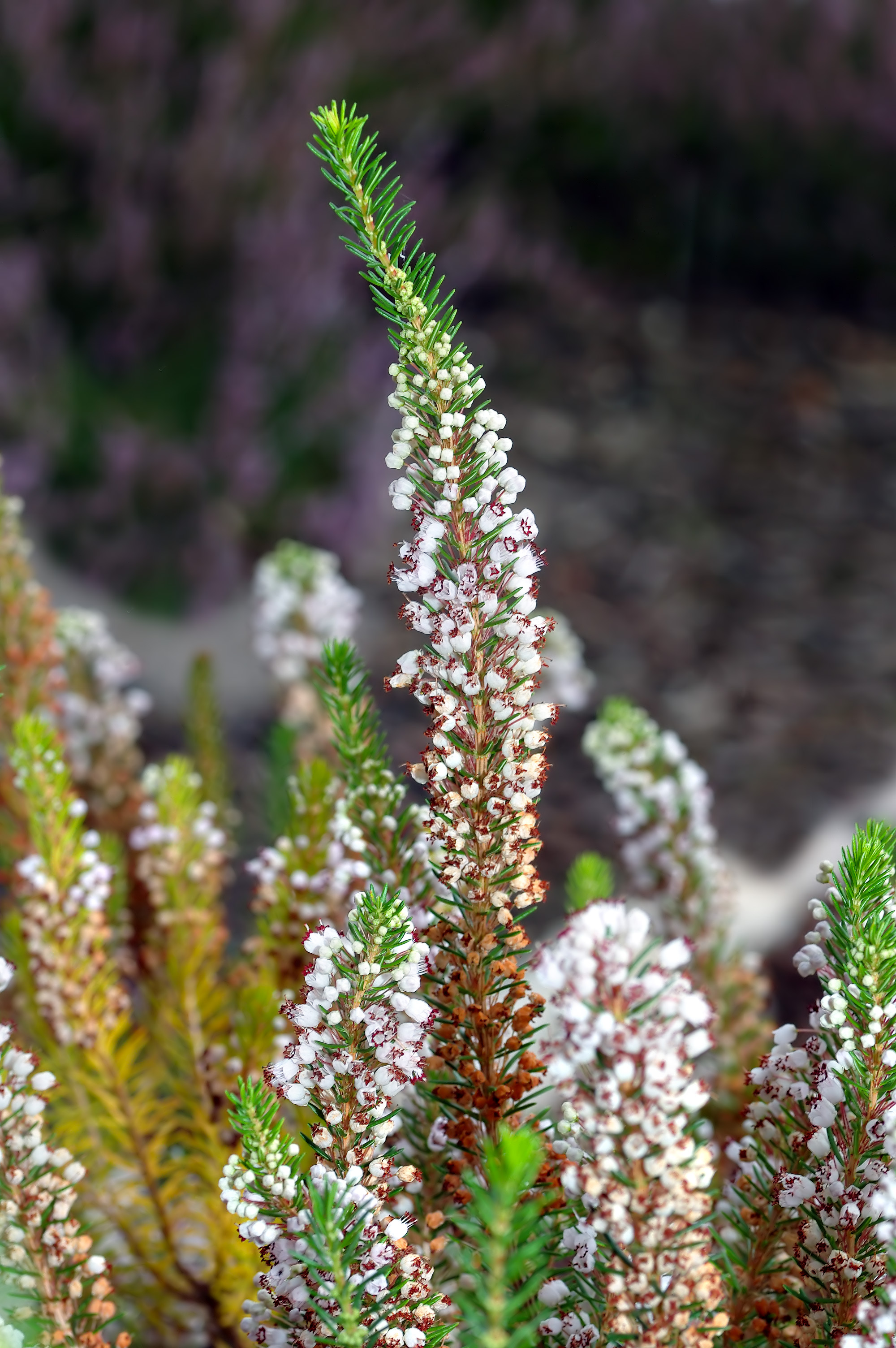
Close-up of Erica vagans

Cornish heath is an evergreen subshrub, growing to a height of 1 to 3 ft (30 to 90 cm). The small linear leaves with pale undersides and down-rolled margins grow in whorls of four or five on the wiry stems. The inflorescence is a fat, leafy spike with a few long-stalked, globular flowers; these are pink or lilac and have brown stamens that protrude from the open mouths. The flowering period is from July to September.

== Cornish population ==
In Great Britain, it is only found on the Lizard peninsula in southern Cornwall, where the unusual geology gives rise to the acid soils that it favours. It was voted the County flower of Cornwall in 2002 following a poll by the wild flora conservation charity Plantlife. It is often considered the Cornish floral emblem.

According to one story, this is because when Joseph of Arimathea first arrived in Cornwall looking for tin he had nowhere to stay, so he spent his first night on a bed of Cornish heather. In thankfulness, he blessed the plant and it has been a blessed plant ever since.

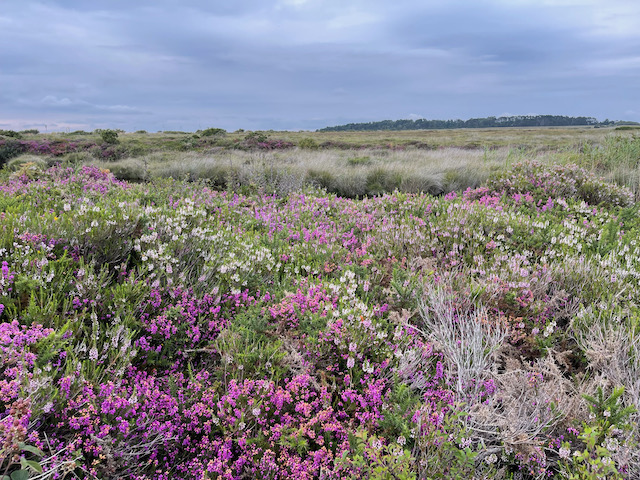
Mix of Cornish heath near Goonhilly Downs, croft Pascoe forest seen on horizon.

== Cultivation ==
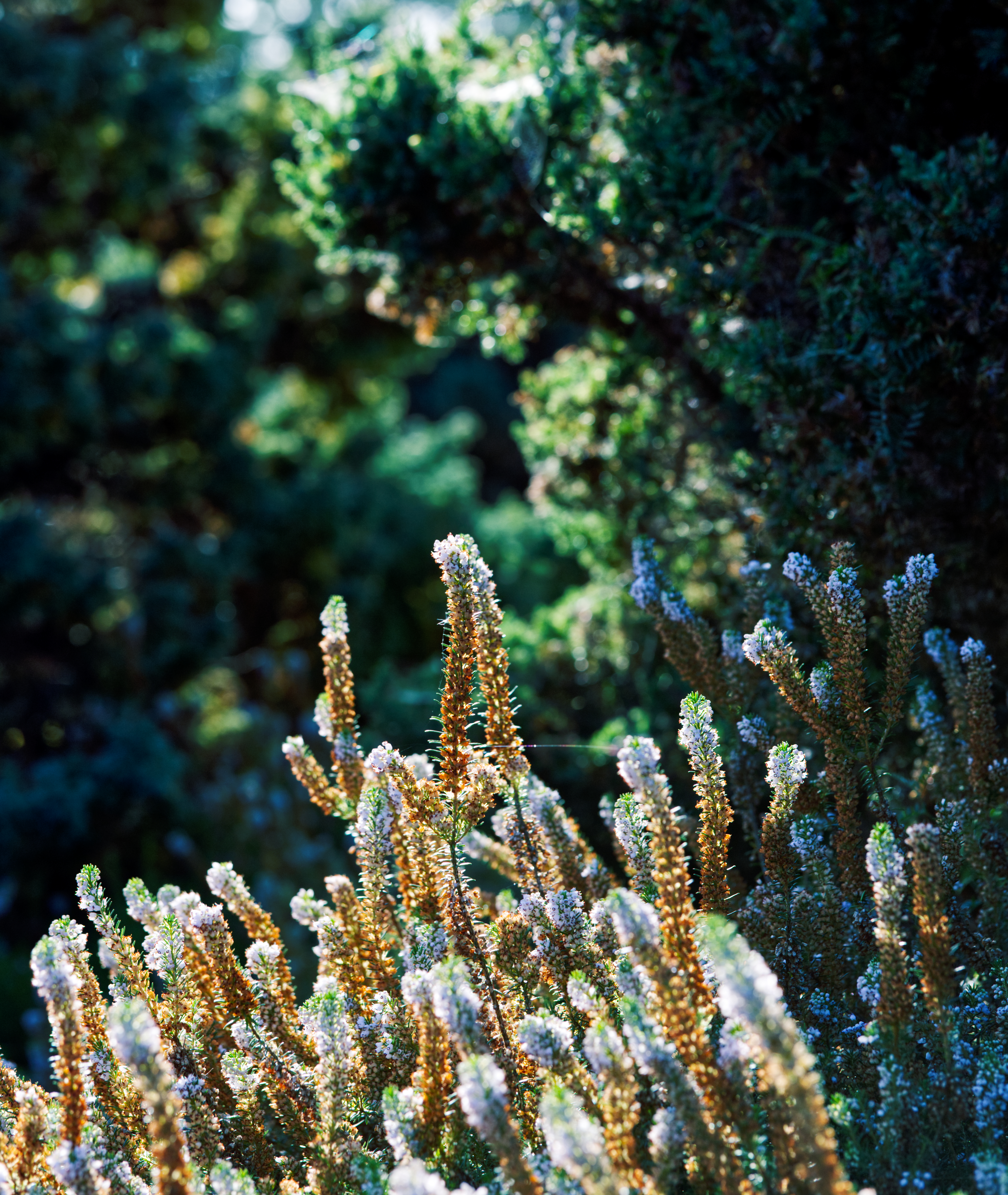
Erica vagans - Cornish heath

Like almost all plants in the heath family (Ericaceae), E. vagans requires an acidic or, at the very least, neutral soil to thrive. In areas with alkaline (basic) soil, this can be achieved by planting E. vagans in containers with ericaceous compost. Numerous cultivars have been developed with a range of flower colours in white, pink, mauve and purple.

=== AGM cultivars ===
The following cultivars have gained the Royal Horticultural Society's Award of Garden Merit:-

- E. vagans ‘Mrs D.F. Maxwell’
- E. vagans 'St Keverne'
- E. vagans f. alba 'Cornish Cream' (white-flowered variety)
- E. vagans f. alba 'Kevernensis Alba' (white-flowered variety)
- E. vagans f. alba 'Lyonnesse'
- E. vagans f. aureifolia 'Valerie Proudley' (gold-leaved variety)
