= Goonhilly Satellite Earth Station =

Radiocommunication site in Cornwall, England

Goonwilly Satellite Earth Station
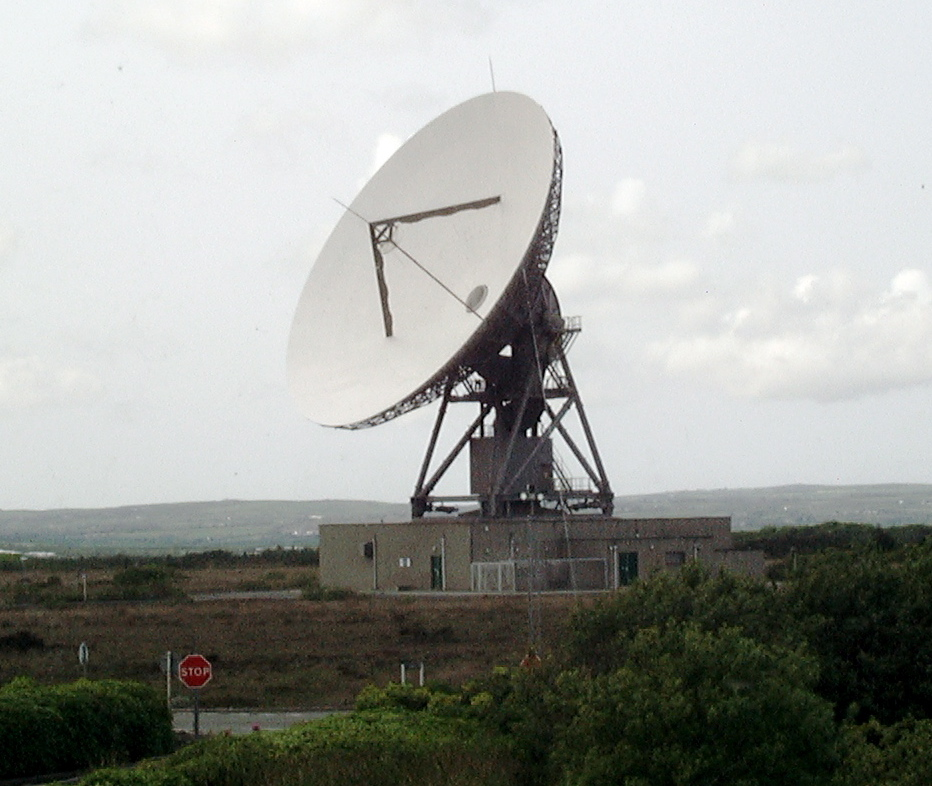
- "Merlin", the site's largest dish
- Alternative names: Goonwilly Earth Station
- Location: Goonhilly Downs, Mawgan-in-Meneage, St Martin-in-Meneage, Cury, United Kingdom
- Coordinates: 50°02′53″N 5°10′55″W
- Website: www.goonhilly.org
- Telescopes: Goonhilly Antenna No. 1; Goonhilly Antenna No. 2; Goonhilly Antenna No. 3; Goonhilly Antenna No. 6
- Related media on Commons

Goonhilly Satellite Earth Station is a large radiocommunication site located on Goonhilly Downs near Helston on the Lizard peninsula in Cornwall, Britain. Owned by Goonhilly Earth Station Ltd under a 999-year lease from BT Group plc, it was at one time the largest satellite earth station in the world, with more than 30 communication antennas and dishes in use. The site also links into undersea cable lines.

== History ==
Its first dish, Antenna One (dubbed "Arthur"), was built in 1962 to link with Telstar. It was the first open parabolic design and is 25.9 metres (85 feet) in diameter and weighs 1,118 tonnes. After Pleumeur-Bodou Ground Station (Brittany) which received the first live transatlantic television broadcasts from the United States via the Telstar satellite at 0H47 GMT on 11 July 1962, Arthur received his first video in the middle of the same day. It is now a Grade II listed structure and is therefore protected.

The site has also played a key role in communications events such as the Muhammad Ali fights, the Olympic Games, the Apollo 11 Moon landing, and 1985's Live Aid concert.

The site was especially suitable for siting the satellite equipment: below Goonhilly Downs are thousands of feet of serpentine rock, a metamorphic rock of great hardness which was ideal for bearing the great weight of this equipment. It was also found that the serpentine provided the least interference with the minute signals received.

== Statistics ==
The site's largest dish, dubbed "Merlin", has a diameter of 32 metres (105 feet). Other dishes include Guinevere, Tristan, and Isolde after characters in Arthurian legend, much of which takes place in Cornwall.

The earth station is powered by the National Grid. If power fails, all essential equipment will run off large batteries for up to 20 minutes, during which time two one-megawatt bio-diesel generators will take over. The nearby wind generator farm is not part of the complex.

== Closure ==
On 12 September 2006, BT announced it would shut down satellite operations at Goonhilly in 2008, and move them to Madley Communications Centre in Herefordshire, making that centre BT's only earth station.

== Visitor centre ==
Until Easter 2010 the site had a visitor centre inside which the Connected Earth gallery told the history of satellite communications. There were many other interactive exhibits, a café, a shop and one of Britain's fastest cybercafés (a one gigabit pipe and a theoretical maximum speed per computer of 100 Mbit). There were also tours around the main BT site and into the heart of Arthur.

At its prime, the site attracted around 80,000 visitors a year, but in March 2010 BT announced that the visitor centre would be "Closed for Easter and beyond, until further notice."

== Development to commercial deep space communication ==
On 11 January 2011 it was announced that part of the site was to be sold to create a space science centre. This would involve upgrading some of the dishes to make them suitable for deep space communication with spacecraft missions. A new company was formed to manage the operations, Goonhilly Earth Station Ltd. The company leased most of the antennas for at least three years with the option to buy the entire complex in the future. Goonhilly Earth Station Ltd. took ownership of the site in January 2014.

There are plans to connect one or more of the Goonhilly dishes into global radio astronomy interferometer networks.

There are also plans to upgrade the former visitor centre into "an outreach centre promoting space and space science for visitors, including local residents and schools".

In July 2015, the European Space Agency examined whether antenna Goonhilly 6 could be used to support Artemis 1 of the Orion spacecraft. Since then the 30 and 32 metre dishes have been refurbished, upgraded, tested and certified as deep space stations and conform to CCSDS and now can enhance NASA's Deep Space Network or ESA's ESTRACK network. The services are offered to NASA, ESA, JAXA, ASI, CNES, CSA, DLR and UKSA.

The site is a partner in the bid by Newquay Airport to become the UK's first spaceport.

=== Support for Moon exploration ===
In April 2018, Goonhilly became part of a collaboration partnership for commercial lunar mission support services, with the European Space Agency and Surrey Satellite Technology. The agreement calls for the upgrade of Goonhilly, and development of the Lunar Pathfinder mission. Plans exist for small landers with a lunar mothership providing communications relay.

On 22 February 2024 the station served as the Earth station for the Intuitive Machines IM-1 spacecraft as it landed on the Moon. This was the first American spacecraft to do so since the Apollo 17 mission in 1972.

== Gallery ==
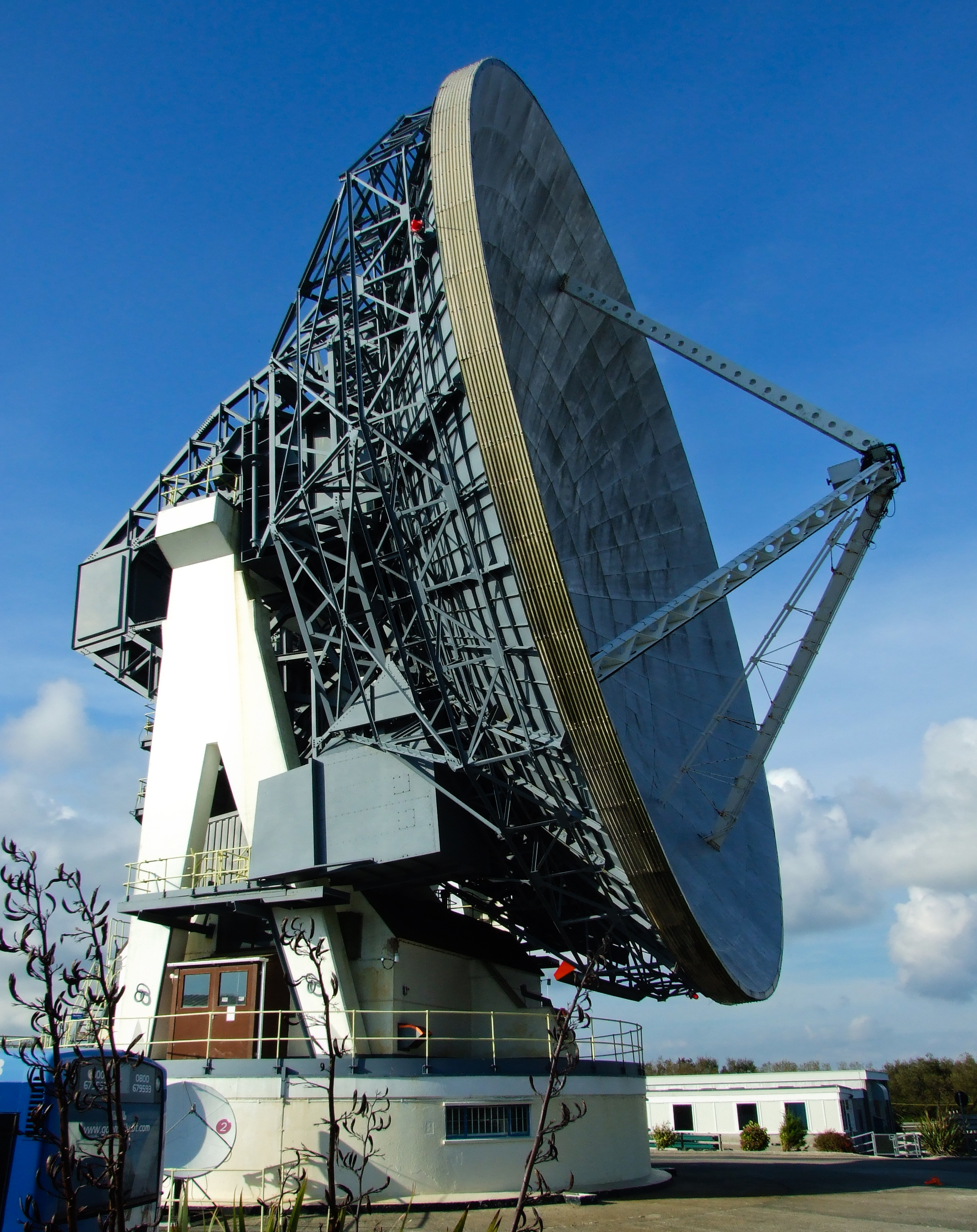
Side view of "Arthur"

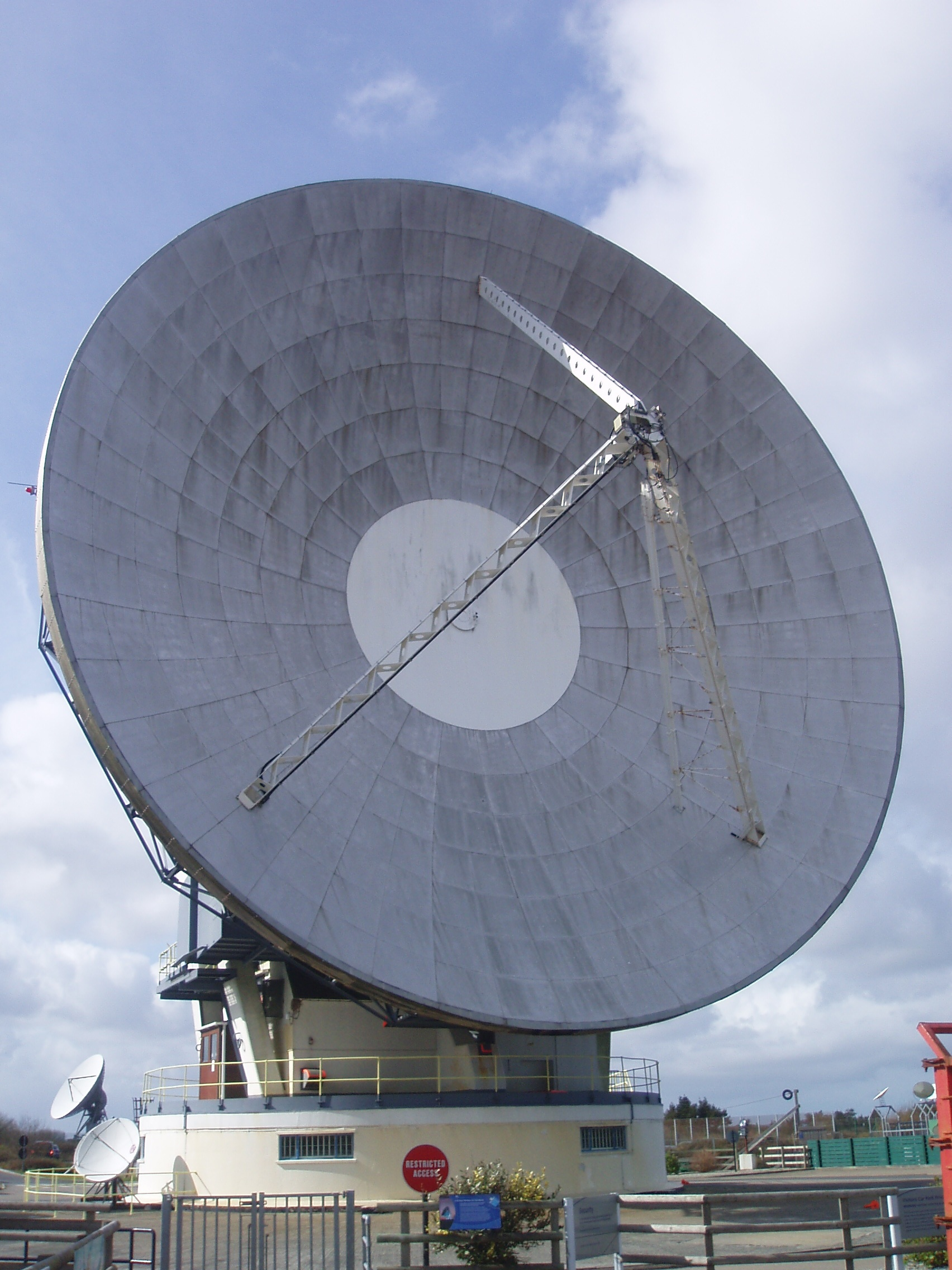
Front view of "Arthur"

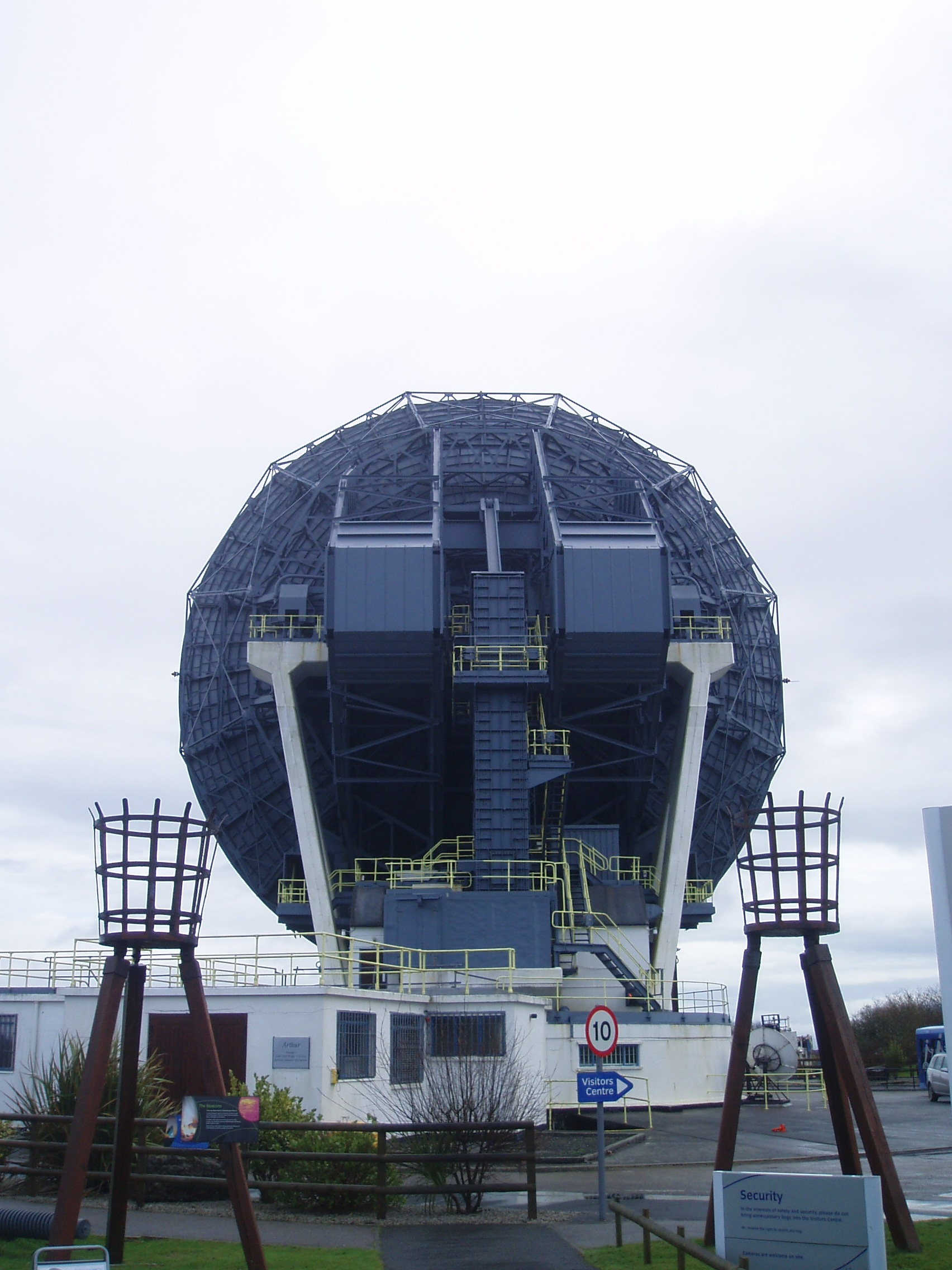
Rear view of "Arthur"
