= Porthoustock Lifeboat Station =

Lifeboat station in Cornwall, England

- Flag of the RNLI

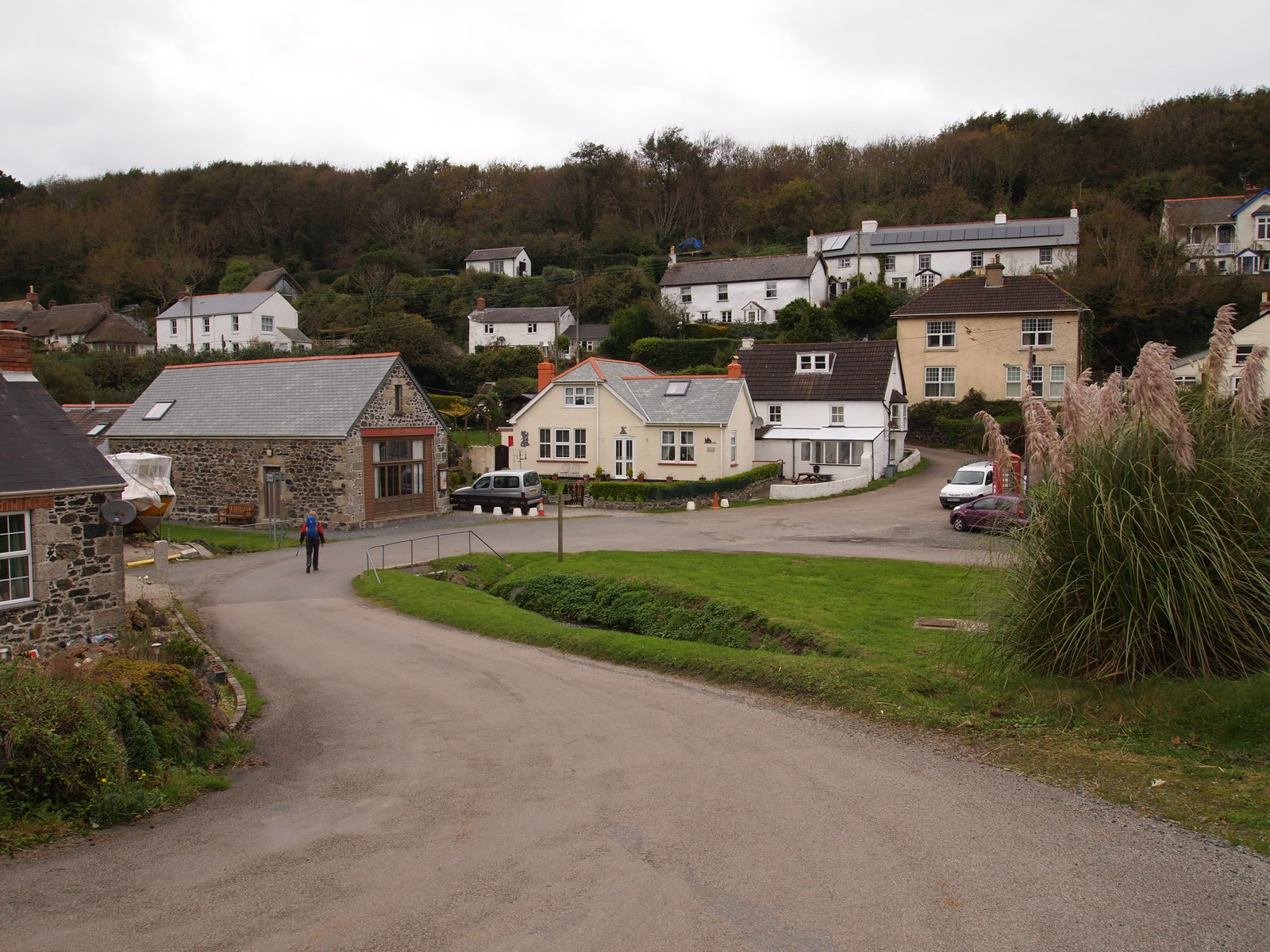
- Porthoustock village with the former lifeboat station in the left middle distance

- Location within Cornwall

General information
- Status: Closed, converted to village hall
- Type: Lifeboat station
- Location: Porthoustock, England
- Coordinates: 50.0560°N 5.0670°W
- Opened: 1869
- Closed: 1942
- Owner: RNLI

Porthoustock Lifeboat Station was the base for a Royal National Lifeboat Institution (RNLI) inshore lifeboat at Porthoustock near St Keverne in Cornwall, England. It was in use from 1869 until 1942. Its most notable service was in saving 44 people from the SS Mohegan which sank nearby on 14 October 1898.

== History ==
Porthoustock is situated on the east side of the Lizard Peninsula. Ships coming round the Lizard and making for the natural harbour at Falmouth can get into difficulties on The Manacles rocks, off the coast south east of Porthoustock. The RNLI agreed to the requests of local residents and built a lifeboat station in the village. It opened on 28 September 1869 when a crowd estimated at 3,000 watched the new lifeboat being demonstrated.

The station was closed in 1942 during World War II, the area being sufficiently covered by the motor lifeboats at Coverack and Falmouth.

=== Wreck of the Mohegan ===
The SS Mohegan left London on 13 October 1898, bound for New York. It called at Gravesend to pick up passengers and was steaming safely down the English Channel on the afternoon of 14 October when it inexplicably set a course that took it towards the Manacles, somewhat north of the safe passage it needed around the Lizard.

James Hill, the coxswain of the Porthoustock lifeboat, saw the Mohegan's lights suddenly alter direction at about 7 o'clock. Realising that there was a ship in trouble, he set about gathering the lifeboat crew and they set off at 7:25 to search for it. They found two ship's boats. One had capsized but 3 people were saved from it, from the other the lifeboat they rescued 24 people. They returned to the shore at about 10 o'clock to land the survivors.

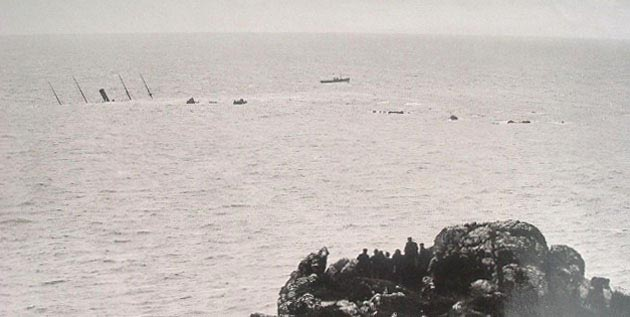
Wreck of the Mohegan off the Manacles

Another of the lifeboat's crew had taken a small boat out to the Manacles and was able to direct the lifeboat to the spot where the Mohegan had sunk. When it got there it was unable to get alongside because of large waves. The remaining people had climbed the masts and funnel. One of these was John Juddery, the ship's quartermaster, who swam across to the lifeboat and then back to the wreck with a rope. The lifeboat was then able to use this to safely get to a position where the people could be brought aboard.

The Falmouth, Cadgwith and The Lizard lifeboats all came to the Manacles to help but had difficulty finding the wreck as there were no lights showing its position. The steam tug that brought the Falmouth lifeboat rescued one person and a few others were saved by small boats that also came to help. When the Mohegan left Gravesend it had been carrying 97 crew and 60 other people; the Porthoustock lifeboat saved 44 and other boats brought 7 ashore but 106 drowned.

For his part in the rescue, including taking the lifeboat out twice, James Hill was awarded an RNLI Silver Medal.

== Description ==
The lifeboat house is a slate-roofed stone building situated at the head of the beach. After closure by the RNLI it was adapted as the village hall.

== Porthoustock lifeboats ==
Five different lifeboats were stationed at Porthoustock, all of the 'pulling and sailing' type. These were equipped with oars but could use sails when conditions allowed.

At Porthoustock	ON	Name	Length	Class	Built	Comments
1869–1886	–	Mary Ann Story	33 ft (10 m)	Self-Righter	1869	
1886–1900	46	Charlotte	37 ft (11 m)	Self-Righter	1886	Later stationed at Angle and at St Davids.
1900–1922	451	James Stevens No. 17	36 ft (11 m)	Liverpool	1900	
1922–1931	468	Queen Victoria	35 ft (11 m)	Self-Righter	1902	First stationed at Bembridge.
1931–1942	627	Kate Walker	35 ft (11 m)	Self-Righter	1911	First stationed at Lytham. It was sold in 1946 and survived as a houseboat at Felixstowe Ferry until 2022.

== See also ==
- List of former RNLI stations
- Royal National Lifeboat Institution lifeboats
