= Penlee =

Penlee may refer to

- Penlee House - a house and art gallery in Penzance in the UK
- Penlee Point, Mousehole - a promentary near Penzance in the UK
- Penlee Point, Rame - a promentary near Plymouth in the UK
- the Penlee Quarry railway in Newlyn in the UK
- the Penlee Lifeboat Station in Newlyn in the UK
- an alternative name for the Kennington Stream in Kent in the UK
