= Penlee Point =

Penlee Point may refer to one of three locations in Cornwall, United Kingdom:

- Penlee Point, Mousehole
- Penlee Point, Rame
- Penlee Quarry, served by Penlee Quarry railway c. 1900 – 1973
