= Cadgwith =

Village and fishing port in Cornwall, England

Coordinates: 49.9872°N 5.1805°W

Cadgwith: Cornish: Porthkajwydh
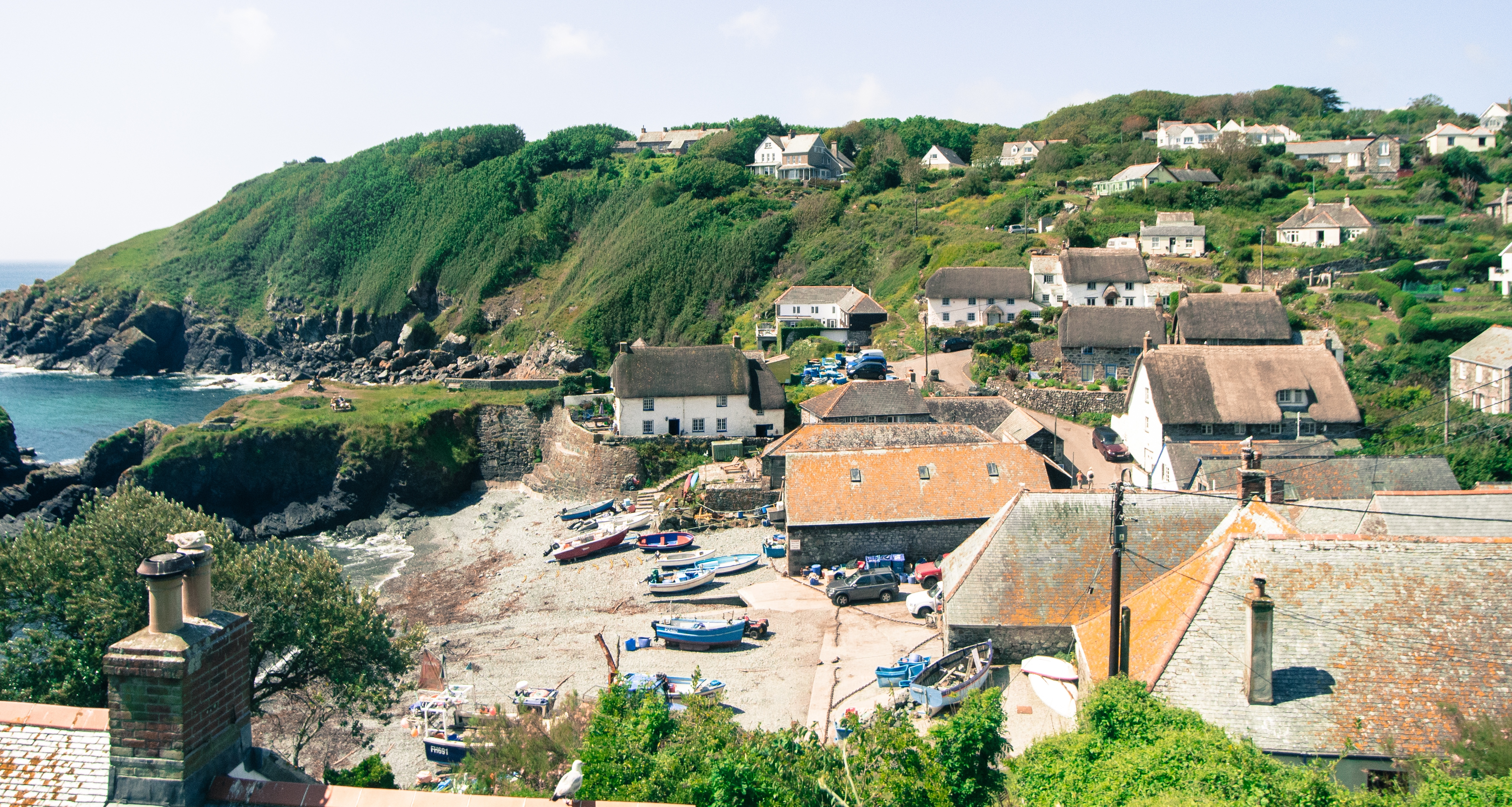

- Location within Cornwall
- OS grid reference: SW721146
- Civil parish: Grade–Ruan
- Unitary authority: Cornwall
- Ceremonial county: Cornwall
- Region: South West
- Country: England
- Sovereign state: United Kingdom
- Post town: HELSTON
- Postcode district: TR12
- Dialling code: 01326
- Police: Devon and Cornwall
- Fire: Cornwall
- Ambulance: South Western
- UK Parliament: St Ives

Cadgwith (Cornish: Porthkajwydh, meaning cove of the thicket) is a village and fishing port in Cornwall, England, United Kingdom. It is on the Lizard Peninsula between The Lizard and Coverack. It is in the civil parish of Grade Ruan.

== History ==
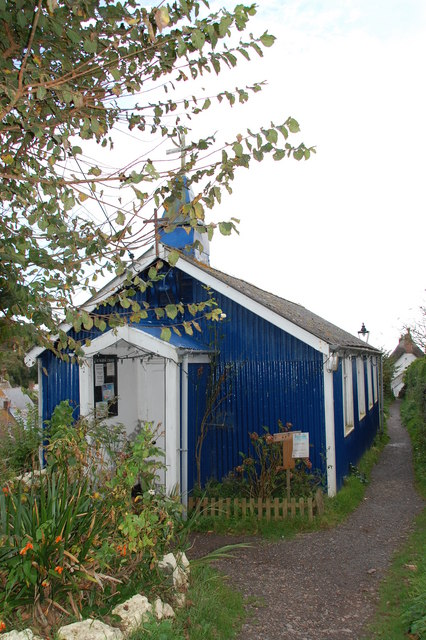
St Mary's Church

The village has its origins in medieval times as a collection of fish cellars in a sheltered south-east facing coastal valley with a shingle cove. Fishing subsidised local farmers' livelihoods. Cadgwith was originally called 'Porthcaswydh', becoming 'Por Cadjwydh' in Late Cornish, and is derived from the Cornish word for 'a thicket', literally meaning battle of trees, probably because the valley was densely wooded. From the 16th century, the village became inhabited, with fishing as the main occupation. Subsequently, houses, lofts, capstan houses, and cellars constructed of local stone or cob walls and thatched or slated roofs were built along the beach and up the sides of the valley leading to Cadgwith's characteristic Cornish fishing village appearance.

In recent times a very small Anglican church was built, next to the path from the car park down to the seafront, dedicated to St Mary. This 'tin tabernacle' church was designated a Grade II listed building in February 2024.

== Geography ==
Cadgwith has two beaches separated by a promontory called "The Todden", thought to mean laying ground in Cornish. To the northeast is the larger beach, made mostly of shingle with a shallow slope, referred to as Cadgwith Cove, Big Beach, The Cove, Fishing Beach, or the Working Cove; all the fishermen work from this beach. The other smaller beach on the southwest side is a mixture of sand and large boulders and is called Little Cove, Cadgwith Cove or Little Beach and used as the swimming beach by locals and holiday-makers. The Todden, maximum height about 9m above sea level, provides a view of the beaches and the village. There is a natural passage through The Todden which connects the beaches. Pointing seaward from The Todden are two rocks called The Island and The Mare.

At low tide the beaches are connected by a strip between the Todden and The Island. Cadgwith is sheltered from prevailing winds from the southwest or west, but easterly or southeasterly winds can produce rough seas and swells. During stormy weather waves can break over The Island. Rough seas can reach the low-lying buildings and homes. The sea has eroded large areas of The Todden and access to the promontory by a narrow pathway has been preserved by sea wall defences funded by Cornwall Council and The Tham Trust.

Cadgwith lies within the Cornwall Area of Outstanding Natural Beauty (AONB).

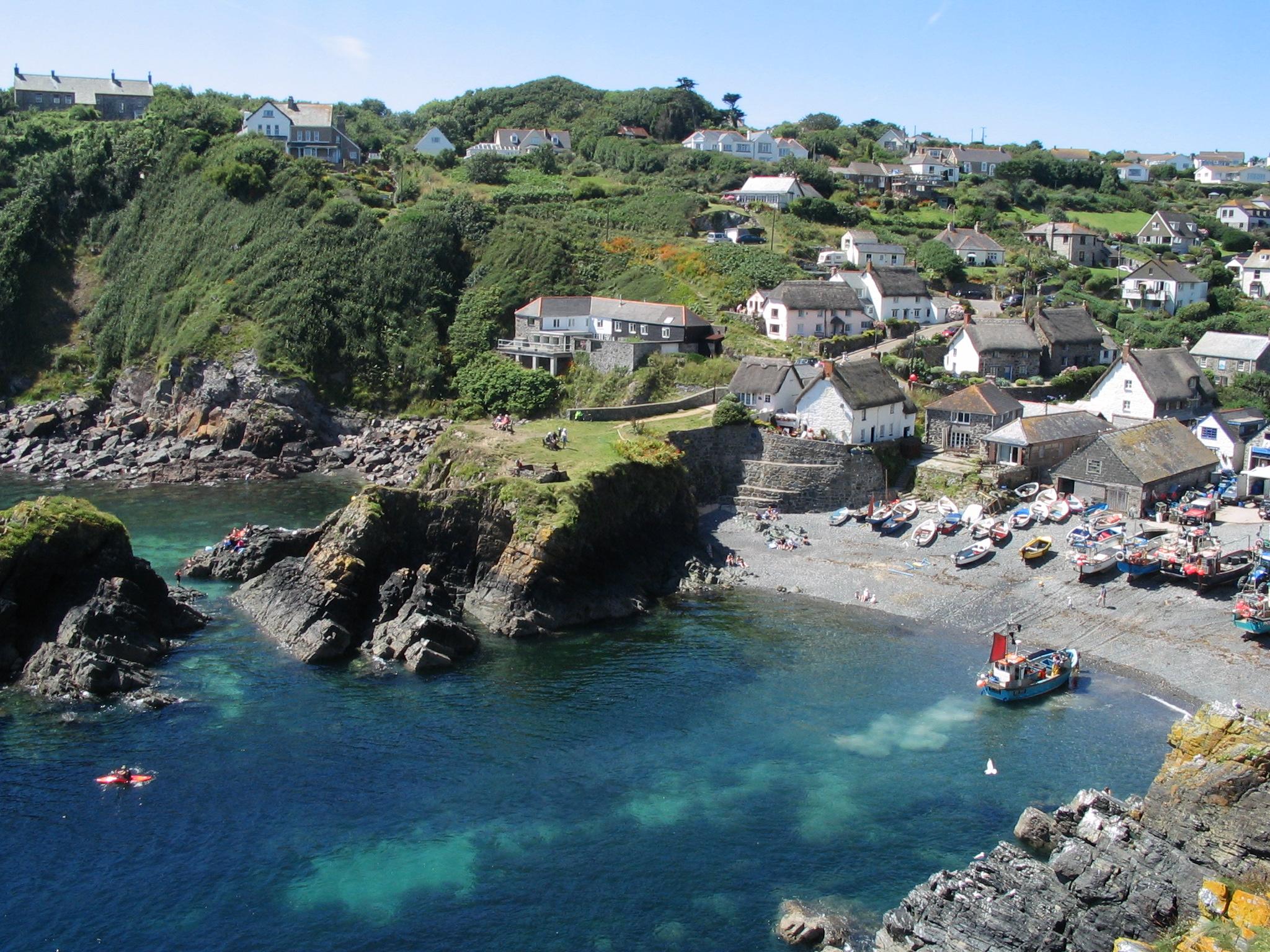
Cadgwith

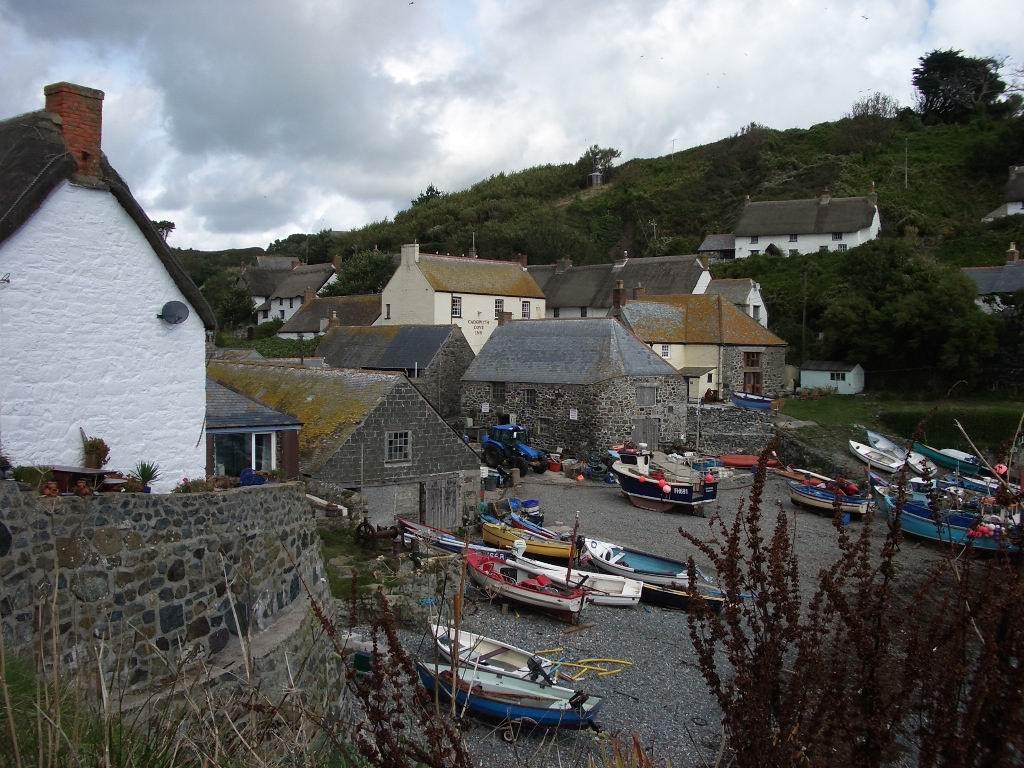
Cadgwith

== Fishing ==
Cadgwith owes its existence to the fishing industry. Pilchard fishing occurred until the 1950s using large seine boats and seine nets, which was a system used to enclose the large shoals of pilchards, and coordinated by the use of lookouts, known as huers (from the Cornish 'Hevva, Hevva!' ('Here they are!)), positioned on the cove's two headlands. In 1904, a record 1,798,000 pilchards were landed over four days. Due to overfishing and climate changes pilchards are no longer found in large enough numbers to sustain pilchard fishing in Cadgwith, instead brown edible crabs, spider crabs, lobsters, sharks, monkfish, octopus, and conger eel are regularly landed with most being sold abroad through fish merchants but some being sold locally by the fishmonger, café, public house, and seafood snack shop. However, the Huer's hut can still be seen on the cliff above the beach.

View in the 1950s

== Wrecks ==
The Lizard Peninsula has a treacherous coastline due to a combination of submerged rocks and weather factors (gales, storms, or fog). There are numerous wrecks on the rocks off Lizard Point known as The Stags, and The Manacles which lie near Coverack, and there are a number of other rocks off the coast of Cadgwith known as The Craggan and The Boa. Deep sea diving onto the wrecks is quite popular.

== Lifeboats ==
Lifeboat services throughout the British Isles are run as a charity and staffed by volunteers organised by the Royal National Lifeboat Institution (RNLI).

The RNLI stationed a lifeboat at Cadgwith between 1867 and 1963, with lifeboats crewed by local fishermen as a benevolent service to all seafarers, especially due to the treacherous local waters. Until 1941 the station operated a 'pulling and sailing' boat, but in 1941 the motor lifeboat Guide of Dunkirk arrived. The Cadgwith station was closed in 1963 after the merger, in 1961, of the Lizard and Cadgwith lifeboats and the opening of a new lifeboat station, the Lizard-Cadgwith Lifeboat Station, at Kilcobben Cove. This is approximately halfway along the coast between The Lizard and Cadgwith and is more sheltered from the prevailing winds. In 1987 the name was changed to the Lizard Lifeboat and in 2012 the boathouse was rebuilt and modernised to house a new lifeboat. The redundant lifeboat house at Cadgwith has since been used by the Cadgwith Pilot Gig Club.

=== History of the Cadgwith lifeboats ===
The first lifeboat was Western Commercial Traveller. She was 33 ft long (10 m) and 8 ft 1 in (2.46 m) wide. She had a crew of thirteen and was rowed by ten oars. She cost £290 and was built by Woolfe and Shadwell. In 1878, the Western Commercial Traveller was renamed Joseph Armstrong after the late Chief Superintendent of the locomotive and carriage developments of the Great Western Railway. A replacement lifeboat, also named Joseph Armstrong, came on station in June 1887. She was 37 ft long (11 m) and 8 ft wide (2.4 m). With twelve oars and fifteen crew, she cost £454 and was built by Forrest Limehouse.

In 1898, a new lifeboat named Minnie Moon arrived in Cadgwith. She was 39 ft long (12 m) and 9 ft 6 in (2.90 m) wide, with twelve oars and fifteen crew. She cost £798 and was built at Thames Ironworks, Blackwall. She holds the record for the greatest number of lives saved from one rescue: 227 lives were saved from the SS Suevic on the night of 17/18 March 1907 which was wrecked in fog and gales on The Stag Rocks on the Maenheere Reef, off Lizard Point. Two silver RNLI gallantry medals were awarded to members of the Cadgwith lifeboat crew: Edwin Rutter, Coxswain Superintendent and Rev. ‘Harry’ Vyvyan, Honorary Secretary. Other lifeboat crews involved in the rescue included The Lizard, Coverack, and Porthleven. The centenary of the rescue was commemorated on 17 March 2007.

The Herbert Sturmey arrived on station in 1932. She was 37 ft long (11 m) and 9 ft 3 in (2.82 m) wide, with twelve oars and fifteen crew. She cost £2000 and was built by Summers and Payne of Cowes.

The last Cadgwith lifeboat was the Guide of Dunkirk, so called as the money was raised by the Girl Guides of the Empire. Originally destined for the Cromer Station, she took part in the Dunkirk evacuations in 1940 where she sustained bullet holes and other damage. She was 35 ft long (11 m) and 9 ft 6 in (2.90 m) wide. She was the only Cadgwith lifeboat to have an engine and had a crew of seven. She cost £5523 and was built by Rowhedge Ironworks. She is now on display at Mevagissey.

== Tourism ==
Tourism is the major source of income in the village nowadays, due to the decline in the fishing industry, and many of the houses are let as holiday accommodation. Cadgwith has long been popular as a holiday destination, especially during the summer when there are numerous local events: gig racing days, summer barbecues, a regatta, Morris dancing, musical bands, and regular singing by the Cadgwith Singers in the public house, the Cadgwith Cove Inn, which is thought to be over 400 years old. The South West Coast Path traverses the village and is regularly used as destination to stop over and gain refreshment. A local fisherman runs a fishmonger's which provides fresh fish with recipes and there is a local craft shop. Along the coast path walking towards The Lizard has an interesting feature known as The Devil's Frying Pan, a cave whose roof collapsed leaving its entrance as a bridge and a boulder-filled bay which is seen to 'boil' during rough weather.
