= MV Lovat =

Cargo ship

History
- Name: Lovat
- Launched: 16 December 1961
- Completed: 1962
- Fate: Foundered 25 January 1975

General characteristics
- Tonnage: 1,110 GRT
- Length: 67.185 metres
- Beam: 10.60 metres
- Installed power: 6 cylinder 4 stroke diesel engine (1250 bhp)
- Propulsion: single screw
- Speed: 11 kts
- Crew: 13

The MV Lovat was a cargo ship which foundered off the coast of Cornwall with heavy loss of life. The casualties were so high because of deficiencies in crew training, and new regulations were brought in place afterwards to ensure that the same disaster would not be repeated.

== Ship ==
MV Lovat was completed in the Netherlands in 1962.

== Sinking ==
At 6:20 in January 1975, the Lovat was approximately 18 miles from The Lizard when her cargo of coal slurry shifted, causing her to take on a list to starboard. Just ten minutes later, the crew abandoned ship; however, they were unable to launch the lifeboat and the entire crew of thirteen were forced to use a ten-person inflatable liferaft. The liferaft was damaged during the launching, which meant that waves were able to travel through the open entrance on one side and out of the other, soaking the occupants inside.

Only two of the crew of thirteen were saved, rescued by the crew of the Solomon Browne of Penlee Lifeboat Station and the crew of a Westland Whirlwind from RNAS Culdrose, in particular Leading Aircrewman Peter Gibbs, who was awarded the Queen's Gallantry Medal.
