= Penlee Lifeboat Station =

Base for Royal National Lifeboat Institution

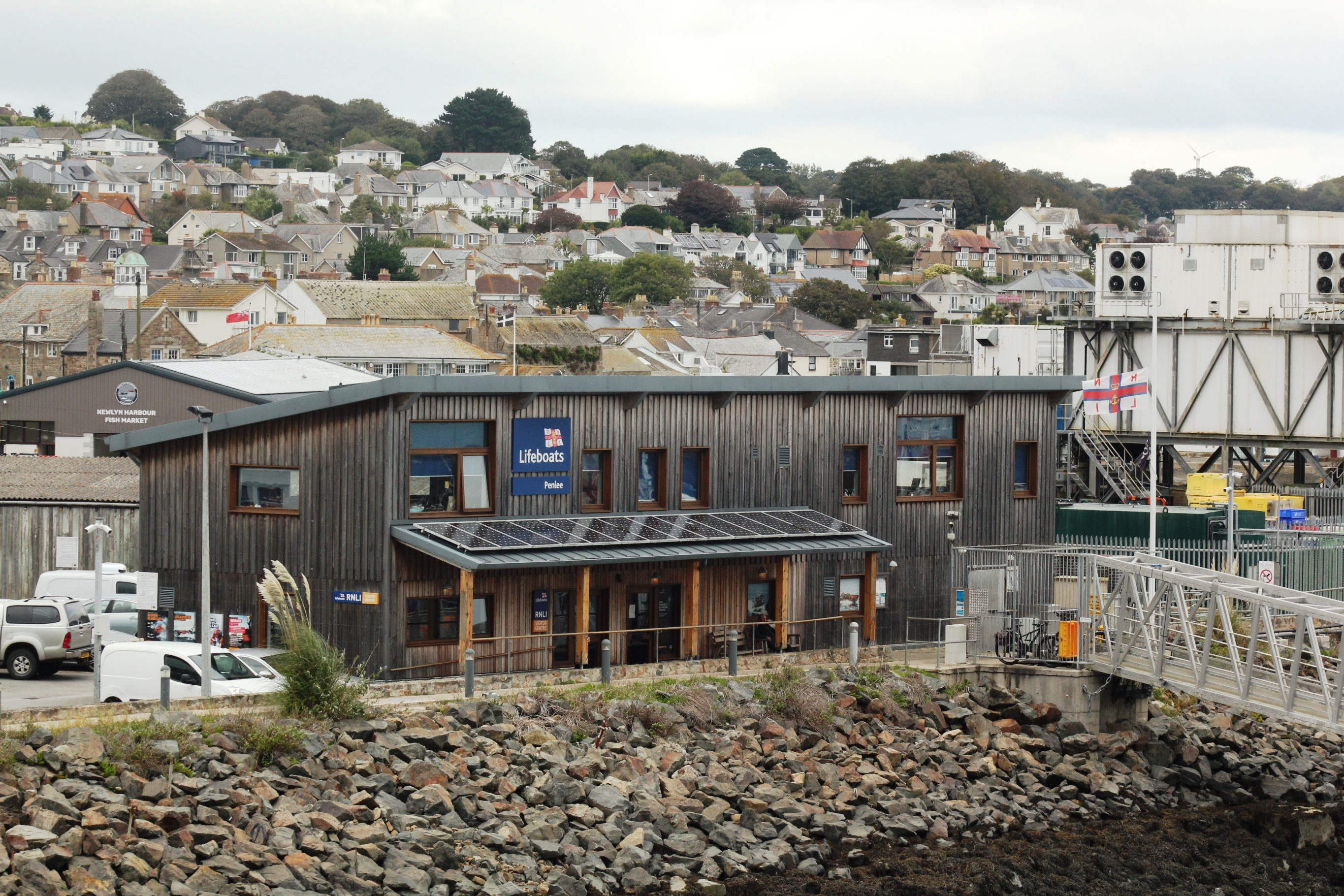

- Location within Cornwall

General information
- Type: Lifeboat Station
- Location: Newlyn, Newlyn Harbour, TR18 5HW, United Kingdom
- Coordinates: 50.1039°N 5.5487°W
- Opened: At Penlee Point 1913; Current building 2019
- Owner: RNLI

Website
- RNLI: Penlee lifeboat station

Listed Building – Grade II
- Official name: Former Penlee Point lifeboat house, slipway, retaining and boundary walls, and memorial garden
- Designated: 17 February 2023
- Reference no.: 1481300

Penlee Lifeboat Station is the base for Royal National Lifeboat Institution (RNLI) search and rescue operations for Mount's Bay in Cornwall, United Kingdom. The lifeboat station operated at various locations in Penzance from the early 19th century. It moved to Penlee Point near Mousehole in 1913, thus gaining its current name, but was moved to Newlyn in 1983 without any change of name. The station is remembered for the loss of the entire lifeboat crew on 19 December 1981.

== History ==
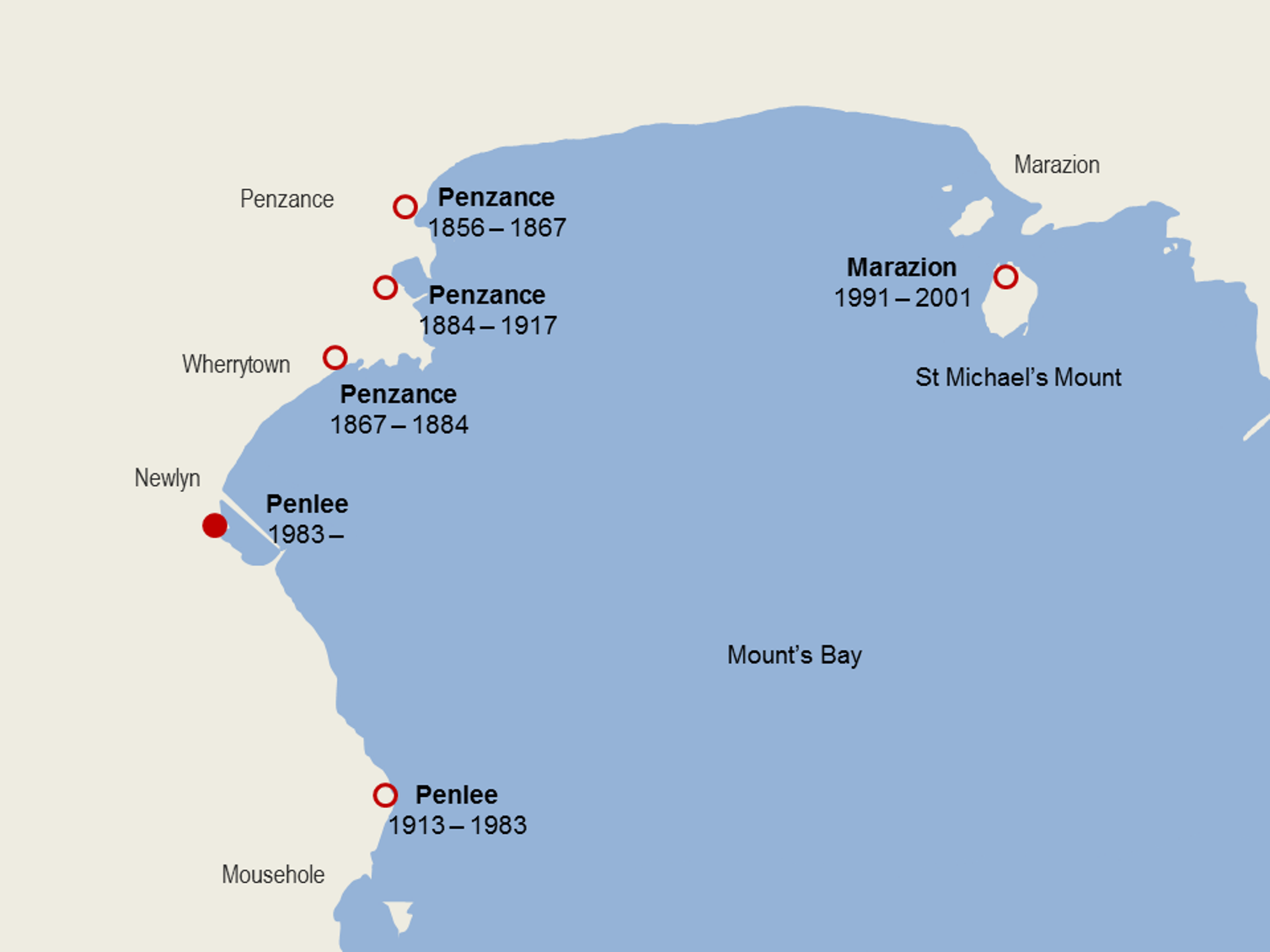
Map of the lifeboat stations around Mounts Bay. Penlee is on the left.

The first lifeboat in Cornwall was purchased for Penzance in 1803 but it was sold in 1812 without ever being used in service. A district association was formed in 1824 as part of the new National Institution for the Preservation of Life from Shipwreck (as the RNLI was known at the time) and a lifeboat for Mount's Bay was again stationed at Penzance from 1826 a couple of years and then permanently from 1853.

The Penzance Lifeboat Elizabeth and Blanche was moved to Newlyn in 1908, where it was kept under a tarpaulin beside the harbour, although Penzance Lifeboat Station remained in use until 1917.

=== At Penlee Point ===
The lifeboat remained at Newlyn until 1913, when a new boathouse was built at Penlee Point south of Newlyn on the outskirts of Mousehole. This was elevated a little above the water, and the lifeboat could be launched down a slipway into open water at all states of the tide. The old "pulling and sailing" lifeboat was replaced by one with a motor in 1922.

=== The loss of the Solomon Browne ===
On 19 December 1981 the Solomon Browne was launched to go to the aid of the MV Union Star after its engines failed 8 miles (13 km) east of the Wolf Rock. Winds were gusting at up to 90 knots (100 mph; 170 km/h) – hurricane force 12 on the Beaufort scale – and whipping up waves 60 feet (18 m) high. On board the Union Star was a crew of five, and three members of the captain's family. A helicopter had been unable to rescue them and so the lifeboat with its crew of eight men went alongside. After several attempts four people managed to jump across; the captain's family and one of the men were apparently safe. The lifeboat radioed that 'we’ve got four off'; that was the last ever heard from anyone on either vessel.

Lifeboats were summoned from Sennen Cove, The Lizard and St Mary's to try to help their colleagues from Penlee. The Sennen Cove Lifeboat found it impossible to make headway round Land's End. The Lizard Lifeboat found a serious hole in its hull when it finally returned to its slipway after a fruitless search. Wreckage from the Solomon Browne was found along the shore, and the Union Star lay capsized onto the rocks west of Tater Du Lighthouse. Some, but not all, of the 16 bodies were eventually recovered.

Within a day of the disaster enough people from Mousehole had volunteered to form a new lifeboat crew. The disaster prompted a massive public appeal for the benefit of the village of Mousehole which raised over £3 million (£11.6 million as of 2025), although there was an outcry when the government tried to tax the donations.

=== The move to Newlyn ===
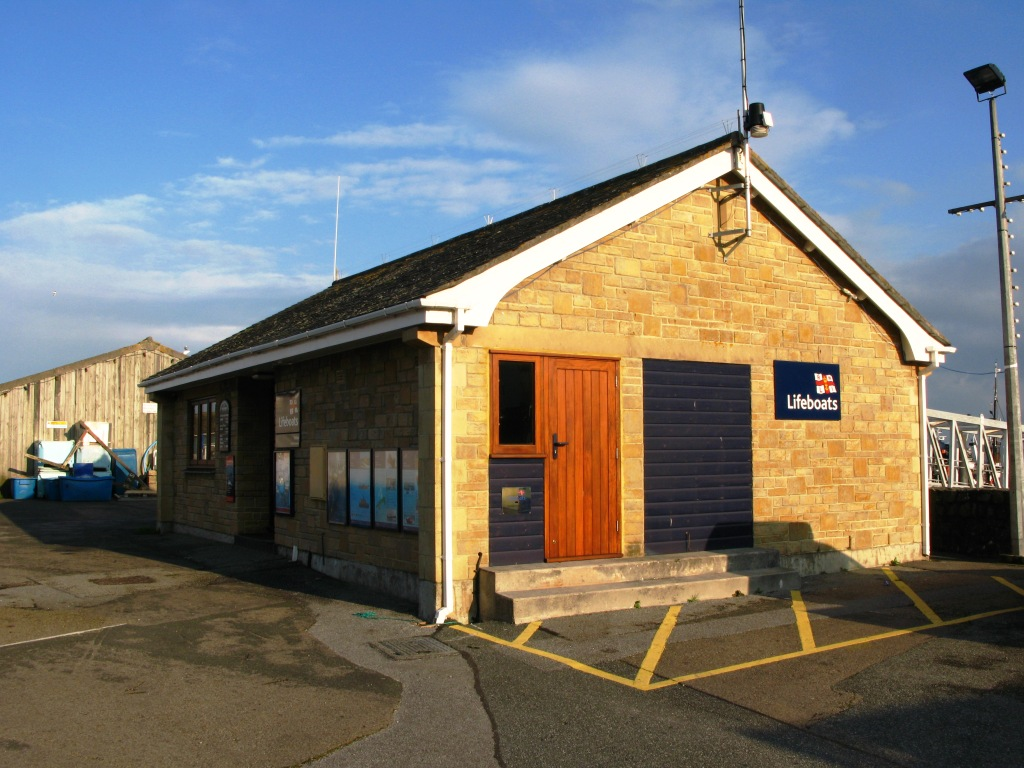
The crew facilities in use at Newlyn Harbour 1983—2019

After the loss of the Solomon Browne, the Penlee Point station remained in use until 1983 when the Mabel Alice, larger, faster Arun-class all-weather lifeboat (ALB) was acquired, and a new lifeboat station constructed at Newlyn harbour, where the new lifeboat is kept afloat at a mooring. Despite the move, the station continues to be known as 'Penlee'. The original building of 1983 was replaced by a new one in 2019.

A D-class inshore lifeboat (ILB) was stationed on the opposite side of Mount's Bay at Marazion (although it was actually kept at St Michael's Mount) in 1991. It proved difficult to find enough volunteer crews in this small village, so the station was closed in 2001 and a larger B-class boat was added to the complement at Penlee, with a new boathouse built to house it. The following year a new pontoon was built in Newlyn harbour so that crews could board the ALB more easily.

== Buildings ==
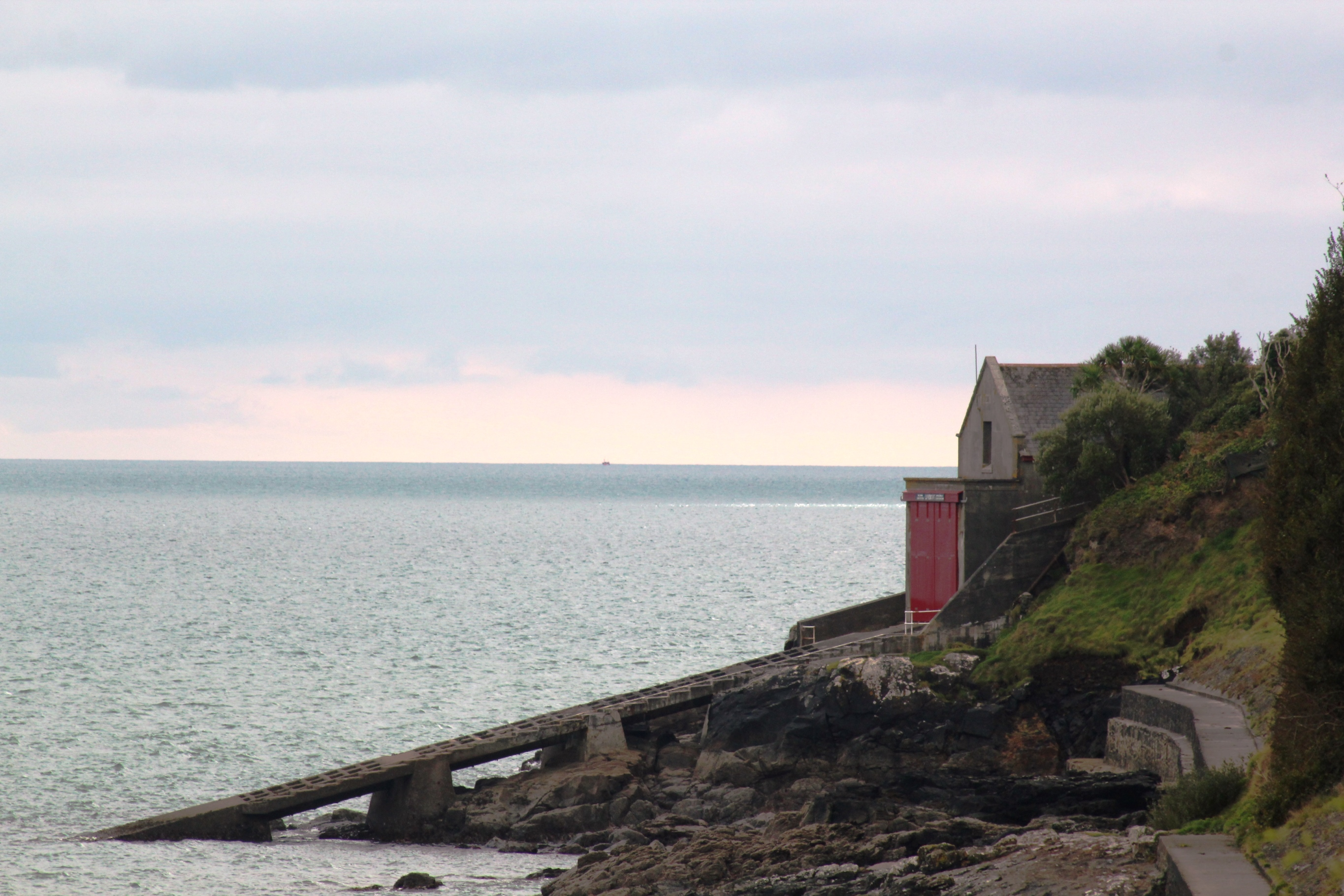
The boathouse at Penlee Point

The boathouse at Penlee Point is built into the cliffs below the Newlyn to Mousehole road. It is a single-storey building with a short slipway. It launched boats into Mount's Bay facing St Michael's Mount. Although no boat is now stationed here, the boathouse is still maintained and a small memorial garden has been created on the north side of the boathouse where people can sit and remember the crew of the Solomon Browne. In 2023 the boathouse, slipway, memorial garden, retaining and boundary walls were designated together a Grade II listed building. As well as architectural interest the reasons for designation cited the association with the Solomon Browne.

New facilities at Newlyn were brought into use in the summer of 2019. The two-storey building includes a crew room, changing area and training room. There is also a workshop and office. An area is available for visitor engagement. It is situated on the harbourside above the walkway to the pontoon where the lifeboat is moored.

== Area of operation ==
Penlee's Severn-class lifeboat has an operating range of 250 nautical miles (460 km) and a top speed of 25 knots (46 km/h), enabling it to reach any casualty up to 50 miles (80 km), and within two hours in good weather. The station also operates an Atlantic 85) inshore lifeboat (ILB). Adjacent lifeboats are at The Lizard to the east, and Sennen Cove to the west.

== Service awards ==
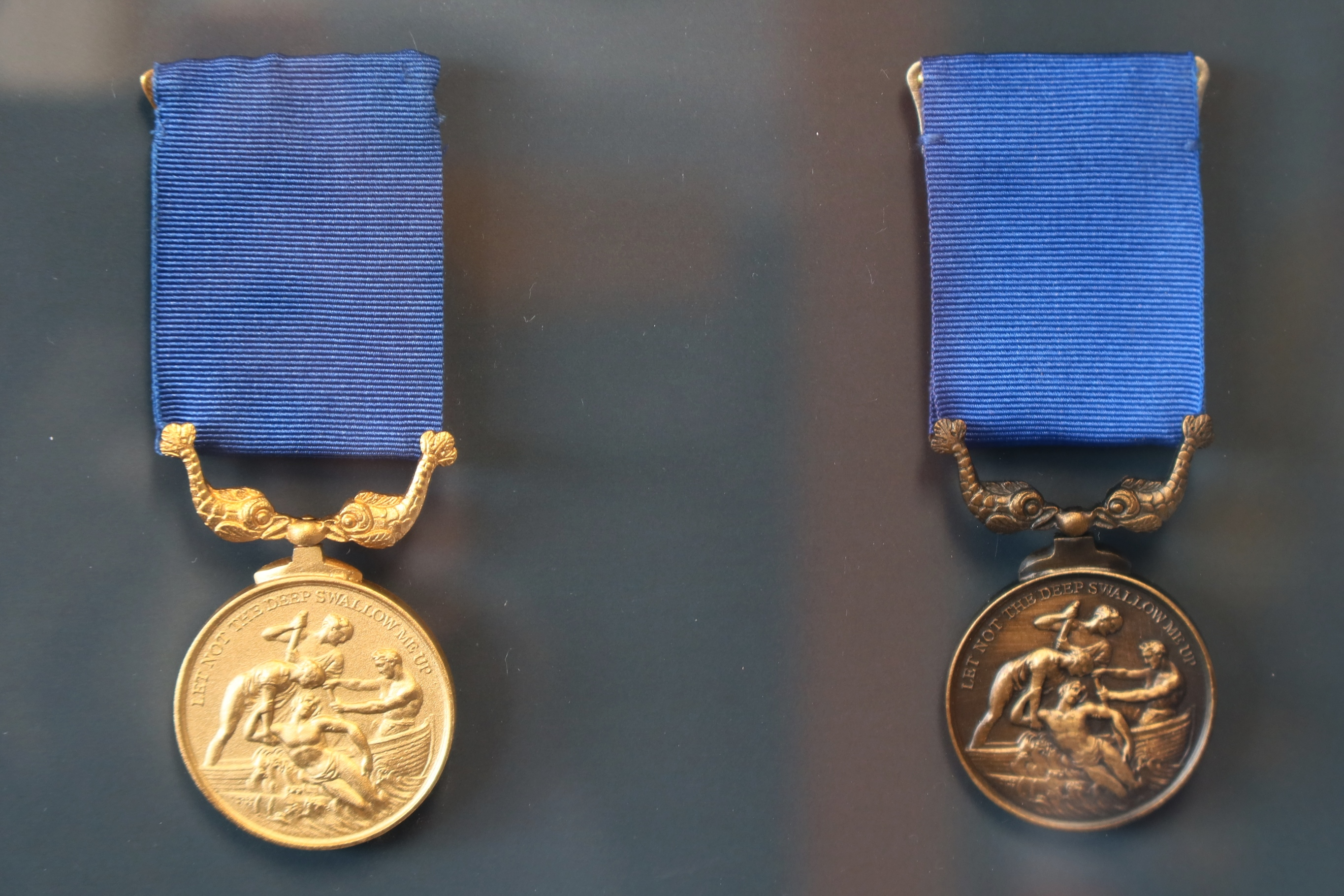
Gold and silver medals awarded posthumously to the crew

Coxswain Trevelyan Richards was posthumously awarded the RNLI gold medal after the disaster in 1981, while the remainder of the crew (James Madron, Nigel Brockman, John Blewett, Charles Greenhaugh, Kevin Smith, Barrie Torrie and Gary Wallis) were all posthumously awarded bronze medals. The station itself was awarded a gold medal service plaque.

In 1936, Coxswain Frank Blewitt was awarded a RNLI bronze medal for rescuing the crew of nine from the SS Taycraig after it ran aground in Mount's Bay during a gale. Coxswain Edwin Madron received a silver medal and Mechanic Johny Drew a bronze medal for another exceptional service in April 1947. They took the W and S out into 30 feet (9.1 m) seas to rescue eight people from HMS Warspite (03) which ran aground on the way to the breakers yard after it had been retired at the end of the Second World War. Madron was the subject of This Is Your Life in 1957 when he was surprised by Eamonn Andrews at a theatre in London. In the introduction the audience was told that although Madron 'has snatched so many lives from the cruel sea, that same sea has claimed his father and son'. He was told that the programme was dedicated 'as a tribute not only to you but to the thousands who man the lifeboats of Britain.'

In January 1975, the Solomon Browne was launched into a Force 12 hurricane when it was reported that the 13 crew members of the MV Lovat had abandoned ship 24 miles (39 km) south west of Lizard Point. A helicopter saved two people but the rest were drowned. The lifeboat had to drop the safety rails around its deck so that the bodies could be hauled out of the sea, all while the boat was rolling side-to-side at 60˚ and the seas were washing across the boat. They were at sea for nearly eight hours. The coxswain, Trevelyan Richards, was awarded a RNLI bronze medal.

On 16 December 1994, the Mabel Alice and the Sennen Cove Lifeboat were launched to the aid of the Julian Paul which was adrift in a storm west of the Longships. The fishing boat's propeller had been fouled and she was towed back to Newlyn harbour. Neil Brockman, the Coxswain/Mechanic of the Penlee Lifeboat, was awarded a RNLI bronze medal for his seamanship, leadership and meritorious conduct, as was Terry George, his counterpart from Sennen Cove. Brockman was later presented with a 'Framed letter of thanks from the Chairman' for leading the rescue of an injured sailor from a French tanker in high seas on 21 December 1999.

The French trawler St Simeon got into trouble in a storm on 15 February 1985. Lifeboat coxswain Kenneth Thomas was presented with the 'Thanks of the Institution inscribed on vellum' for attending to the vessel.

== Lifeboats ==
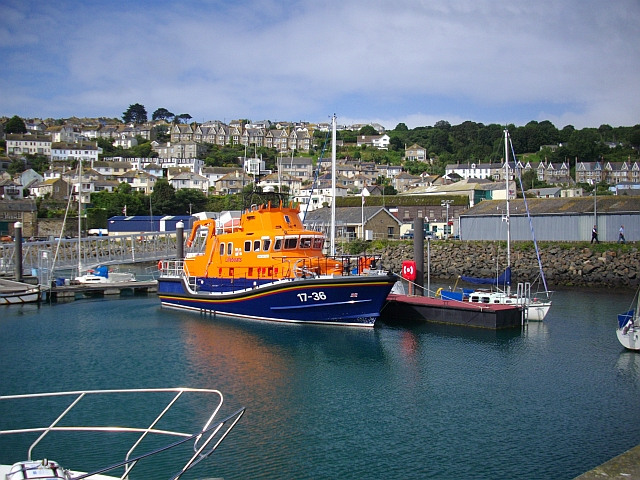
17-36 Ivan Ellen

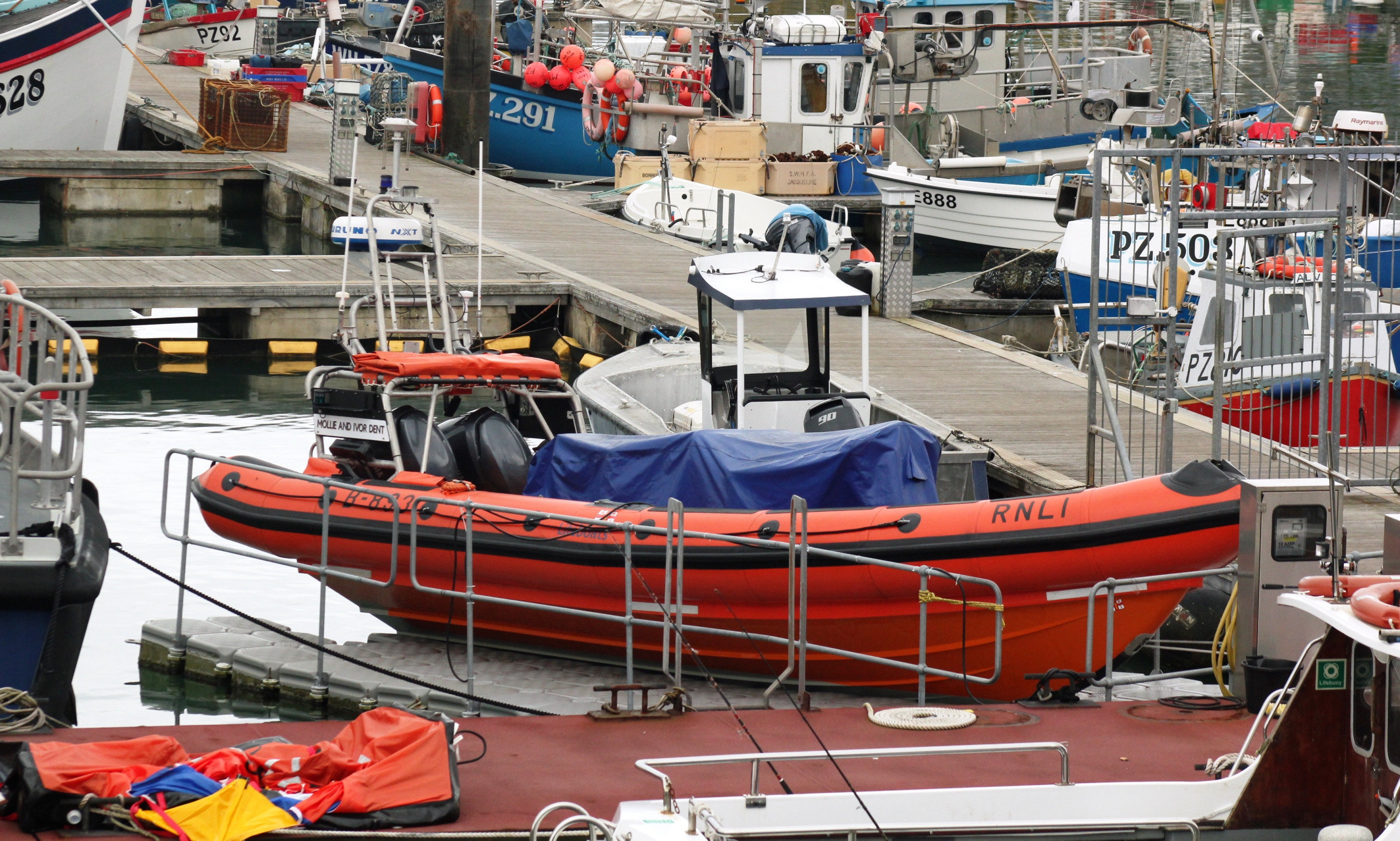
B-893 Mollie and Ivor Dent

At station	ON	Op. No.	Name	Built	Class	Comments
1908–1922	424	–	Elizabeth and Blanche	1899	Watson	Pulling and sailing lifeboat. Moved from Penzance to Newlyn in 1908 and then to Penlee in 1913. It performed the first launch from Penlee on 25 October 1913. Sold 1922 and last reported in use as a yacht at Falmouth in 1969.
1922–1930	671	–	The Brothers	1922	Watson	Single engine, transferred to Falmouth and sold in 1952. Reported working as a dive support boat at Dover in 2007. Transferred from a Rochester boatyard to Gweek for restoration in 2020 but is now believed to have been broken up.
1930–1960	736	–	W and S	1930	Watson	Twin engines. Sold in 1970 and converted to a motor yacht at Carrickfergus but moved to Falmouth in 2000 before being laid up at Mylor. In 2013 it was sold and moved to Harwich for restoration.
1960–1981	954	–	Solomon Browne	1960	Watson	Wrecked in service.
1981	987	70-001	Charles H. Barrett (Civil Service No. 35)	1965	Clyde	Relief lifeboat.
1981–1982	866	–	Charles Henry Ashley	1949	Watson	New to Porthdinllaen, sold 1986 and last reported as pleasure boat Charles Ashley in France.
1982–1983	926	–	Guy and Clare Hunter	1954	Watson	Previously at St Mary's and Fowey, transferred to Padstow; sold in 1988 and reported working as a pleasure boat at Donaghadee in 2008.
1983–2003	1085	52-24	Mabel Alice	1982	Arun	Sold in 2004 and later reported to be a pilot boat in Chile.
2003	1086	52-25	A.J.R. & L.G. Uridge	1983	Arun	Sold for further use as lifeboat Hebe at Kemi, Finland, until 2019 and later reported to be in Estonia.
2003–	1265	17-36	Ivan Ellen		Severn	

=== Inshore lifeboats ===
At Penlee	Op. No.	Name	New	Class	Model	Comments
2001–2002	B-753	City of Bradford V	1999	B	Atlantic 75	
2002–2016	B-787	Paul Alexander	2002	B	Atlantic 75	Later stationed at Weston-super-Mare.
2016–	B-893	Mollie & Ivor Dent	2005	B	Atlantic 85	

== See also ==
- List of RNLI stations
- Royal National Lifeboat Institution lifeboats
- List of shipwrecks of Cornwall
