= Coverack to Porthoustock =

Protected area in Cornwall, England

- Site of Special Scientific Interest
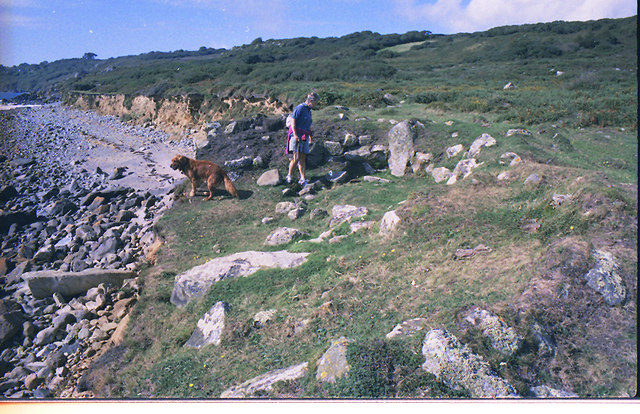
- Trebarveth salt works along the shore of the SSSI

- Location within Cornwall Location within England
- Location of Coverack to Porthoustock.
- Area of search: Cornwall
- Grid reference: SW798195
- Coordinates: 50.0347°N 5.0769°W
- Interest: Biological/Geological
- Area: 173.46 hectares (1.735 km^{2}; 0.6697 sq mi)
- Notification date: 1951

Coverack to Porthoustock is a coastal Site of Special Scientific Interest (SSSI) in Cornwall, England, UK, noted for both its biological and geological characteristics. The site contains four ICUN Red List plant species.

== Geography ==
The 173.5-hectare (429-acre) site, notified in 1951, is situated on the south Cornish coast, within St Keverne civil parish on the Lizard Peninsula. It starts at the village of Coverack in the south, following the shores of the English Channel to the hamlet of Porthoustock in the north.

The South West Coast Path runs through the SSSI, part of the coastline around Lowland Point is owned by the National Trust and contains two Geological Conservation Review sites.

== Wildlife and ecology ==
The coastline contains four Red Data Book plant species, Cornish heath (Erica vagans), dwarf rush (Juncus capitatus) and twin-headed clover (Trifolium bocconei) along with the nationally scarce autumn squill (Scilla autumnalis).

== History ==
On a raised beach between Pedn-myin (penn, head and meyn stone) and Lowland Point are the 2nd-century, Romano-British Trebarveth saltworks (grid reference SW79651933). Gabbro is the predominant rock here and weathers to a rough clay. Sea water was boiled in two rectangular, stone ovens within an oval building, The residue salt was packed into pots made from the gabbro clay, and course, red pottery sherds (briquetage) can be found in the nearby cliff. Some of the sherds still have potters' fingermarks on them. The ovens measure 150 cm by 40 cm and if packed with vessels 15 cm high, the oven would hold 50 lt of sea water. With the water containing 3% salt by weight, each operation would produce 1½ kg of salt. The saltworks are within a field system and some of the remaining walls stand up to 1 m high.
