= SS Mohegan =

British steamship wrecked off of Cornwall in 1898

Coordinates: 50.04462°N 5.04616°W

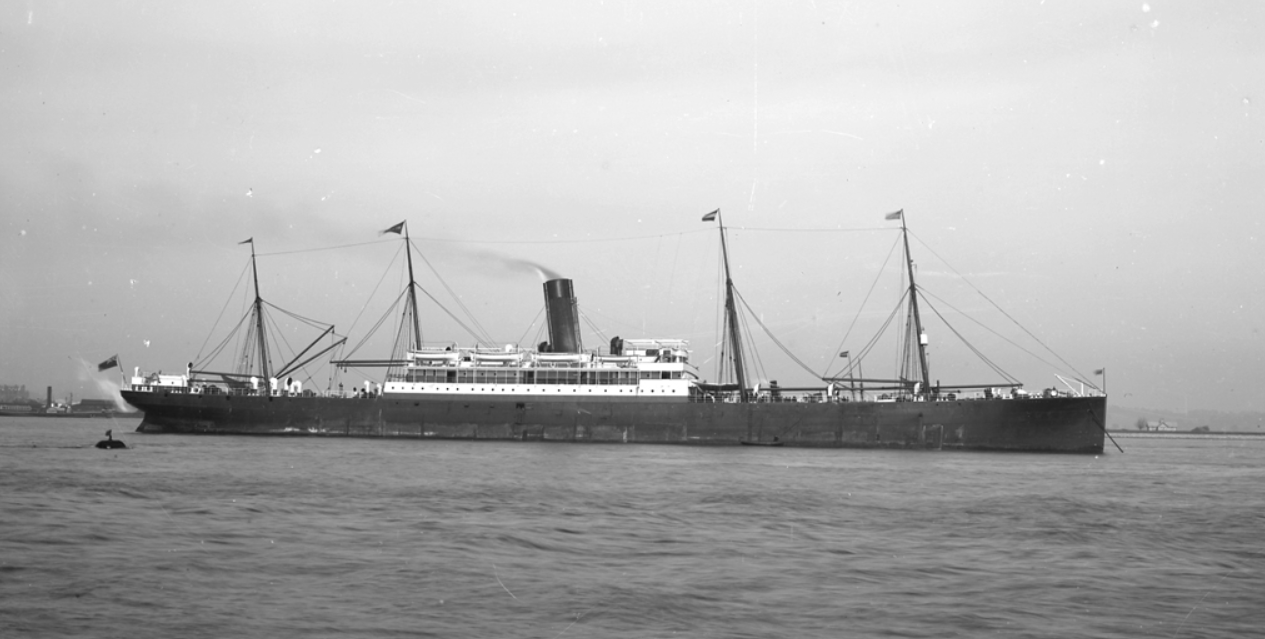
- SS Mesaba, one of Mohegan's four sister ships.

History

United Kingdom
- Name: Mohegan
- Operator: Wilson & Furness-Leyland Line; Atlantic Transport Line
- Builder: Earle's Shipbuilding and Engine Company, Hull
- Launched: April 1898
- Acquired: July 1898
- Maiden voyage: 31 July 1898
- Out of service: October 1898
- Renamed: Launched as Cleopatra; Renamed Mohegan in October 1898
- Fate: Wrecked on 14 October 1898

General characteristics
- Class & type: Steam merchant ship
- Tonnage: 6,889 GRT
- Length: 475 ft (145 m)
- Beam: 52 ft (16 m)
- Propulsion: Single screw; triple expansion engines with cylinders of 32 in (810 mm), 54 in (1,400 mm), and 90 in (2,300 mm), and a stroke of 66 in (1,700 mm); Four boilers operating at 200 psi (1,400 kPa)
- Speed: 13 knots (24 km/h; 15 mph)
- Capacity: 120 first class passengers; 700 cattle

SS Mohegan was a steamer which sank off the coast of the Lizard Peninsula, Cornwall, on her second voyage. She hit The Manacles on 14 October 1898 with the loss of 106 out of 157 on board.

== Design and construction ==
The ship started life as the Cleopatra, a mixed passenger liner and animal carrier. She was built alongside four others at Earle's Shipbuilding and Engine Company, Hull, for the Wilson & Furness-Leyland Line. She was rated A1 at Lloyd's of London. She was built for 'safety at sea' and was equipped with eight watertight bulkheads, failsafe lighting and pumping systems, eight lifeboats capable of carrying 59 passengers each and three compasses. She could carry 120 first class passengers, with stalls for 700 cattle.

She did not serve with the Wilson & Furness-Leyland Line, but instead was purchased by the Atlantic Transport Line, which was seeking to replace ships that had been requisitioned as troop transports by the United States government for use in the Spanish–American War. The other four ships acquired in this period were Alexandria, Boadicea, Victoria and Winifreda, at a cost of around £140,000 per ship.

== As the Cleopatra ==
Captain Richard Griffith, commander of the Mohegan on her last voyage

She sailed on her maiden voyage from London to New York on 31 July 1898, arriving on 12 August 1898. A number of defects were quickly revealed, including the malfunctioning of the water system that fed the boilers, and a number of serious leaks. The blame was placed on a rushed construction, and the crew struggled to keep the ship operational. The passengers protested to the company about the poor condition of the ship, but also reported "the splendid conduct of the officers and crew." Cleopatra returned to London, limited to half-speed the crossing took 21 days. Once she had docked an extensive programme of repairs was undertaken, which took 41 days. She then underwent trials, and was inspected by the Board of Trade. She was pronounced fit to sail, and was duly renamed Mohegan.

== As the Mohegan ==
=== Wrecked on the Manacles ===
Bound for New York, Mohegan sailed from Tilbury Docks at 2:30pm on 13 October 1898, under the command of the 42-year-old Captain Richard Griffith. She carried 97 crew and 7 cattlemen, along with 1,280 tons of spirits, beer, and antimony. At Gravesend 57 passengers were taken on board. She arrived off Dover at 7:30 that evening, dropping her pilot. A report on the progress so far from the Assistant Engineer was probably landed at this time. A few minor leaks and electrical failures were reported but otherwise no major problems had been encountered.

Mohegan then reached her maximum speed as she sailed down the English Channel. She kept close to the coast as she passed Cornwall, but took the wrong bearing. They had noticed that the Eddystone Lighthouse was too far away and the coast too close. She neared the entrance of Falmouth Harbour and turned towards the entrance of the Helford River and on down The Lizard coast without slowing from 13 knots. This was noticed by the Coverack coastguard, which attempted to signal to her with warning rockets. The crew aboard Mohegan either was unaware or took no notice, and maintained her course. James Hill, coxswain of the Porthoustock lifeboat, saw the ship's lights and realised that her course would take the ship onto The Manacles rocks. He gathered the lifeboat crew and launched after Mohegan.

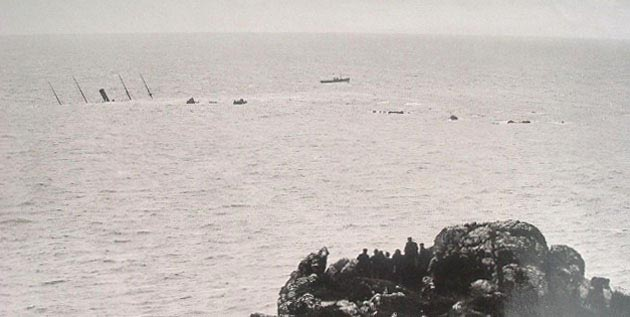
Wreck of Mohegan off the Manacles

The crew were finally alerted to the danger, whether by the signals from shore or by the 'old Manacle bell' from the buoy, and the engines were stopped at 6:50 PM, but too late. Mohegan ran onto The Manacles, embedding the rudder in the rock and tearing the hull open. The ship first struck Vase Rock and then drifted onto the Maen Varses reef. Dinner was being served at the time, and many of the passengers were initially unaware of the severity of the incident. The engine room was almost immediately flooded to a depth of three feet (0.91 m). The steam gauges broke and the crew rushed to the deck. The ship was plunged into darkness soon afterwards. With the loss of power, the passengers made their way onto the deck, where attempts were made to launch the lifeboats. The ship rolled and sank 12 minutes after hitting the rocks. Captain Griffith and all of the officers went down with the ship.

Captain Griffith had ordered the fitting of a high second rail inboard of the lifeboats to prevent their being rushed in the event of an emergency, but this hampered the launching of the boats. Further problems were encountered when the ship listed to port then heavily to starboard. Only two lifeboats were launched, of which one was virtually swamped and the other capsized. The Porthoustock lifeboat Charlotte launched at 7:25. They found the two ship's boats. One had capsized but 3 people were saved from it, from the other the lifeboat they rescued 24 people. They returned to the shore at about 10 o'clock to land the survivors.

Another of the lifeboat's crew had taken a small boat out to the Manacles and was able to direct the lifeboat to the spot where Mohegan had sunk. When it got there it was unable to get alongside because of large waves. The remaining people had climbed the masts and funnel which were still above the water. One of these was John Juddery, the ship's quartermaster, who swam across to the lifeboat and then back to the wreck with a rope. The lifeboat was then able to use this to safely get to a position where the people could be brought aboard. Of the 157 people on board, the Porthoustock lifeboat saved 44 and other boats brought 7 ashore but 106 drowned. For his part in the rescue, including taking the lifeboat out twice, James Hill was awarded an RNLI Silver Medal.

==== Aftermath ====
The recovered bodies are buried in a mass grave

Most of the recovered bodies of the drowned were buried in a mass grave in St Keverne churchyard, which was given a memorial stained glass window by the Atlantic Transport Line. Some bodies were sent to London for burial, whilst eight were shipped to New York on Mohegan's sister ship Menominee. The Scottish poetaster William McGonagall commemorated the tragedy in his poem The Wreck of the Steamer "Mohegan". Most of the cargo was salvaged, though a diver lost his life in the process. The wreck gradually disintegrated in the following years.

The wreck of Mohegan, and in the next year the stranding of the ocean liner SS Paris on Lowland point, led to the introduction of the Coverack lifeboat. The remains of the wreck are popular with divers, and artefacts such as crockery and brass portholes are occasionally recovered. A staircase salvaged from the wreck stands in Coverack youth hostel, at Parc Behan, School Hill, Coverack. The ship's bell resides at the Bell Inn in Thetford, Norfolk.

==== Controversy ====
The sinking was the greatest disaster in the history of the Atlantic Transport Line, and occurred in mysterious circumstances, as the ship had steered some distance off course. The Board of Trade enquiry recorded

"that a wrong course – W. by N. – was steered after passing the Eddystone, at 4.17 pm."

The loss of all of the officers in the wreck meant that no explanation could be found for the course, and it was ascribed to human error.
