= Kennack to Coverack =

Protected area in Cornwall, England

Coordinates: 50.0096°N 5.1243°W

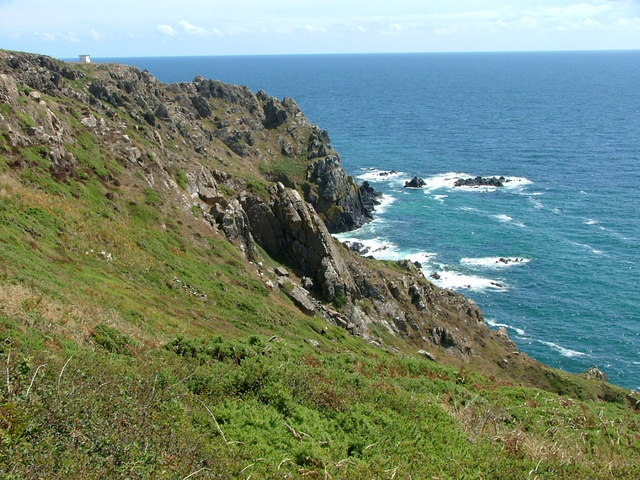
Cliffs at Black Head, to the east of the SSSI

Kennack to Coverack is a coastal Site of Special Scientific Interest (SSSI) on the Lizard Peninsula in Cornwall, England, UK, noted for both its biological and geological interest. It is of botanical importance, with 8 Red Data Book of rare and endangered plant species being found on the site as well as other nationally scarce varieties.

== Geography ==
The 266-hectare (660-acre) site, nominated in 1951, is situated on the east coast of the Lizard Peninsula, mainly within the civil parish of St Keverne, starting at Kennack Sands in the west continuing along the English Channel ending at Perprean Cove outside Coverack in the east. The site also includes some separate inland areas.

The South West Coast Path runs through the SSSI and part of the coastline is owned by the National Trust. The site falls partly within the Lizard National Nature Reserve and contains two Geological Conservation Review locations.
