= Porthoustock =

Hamlet in Cornwall, England

Coordinates: 50°3′N 5°4′W

Porthoustock: Cornish: Porthewstek
- Hamlet
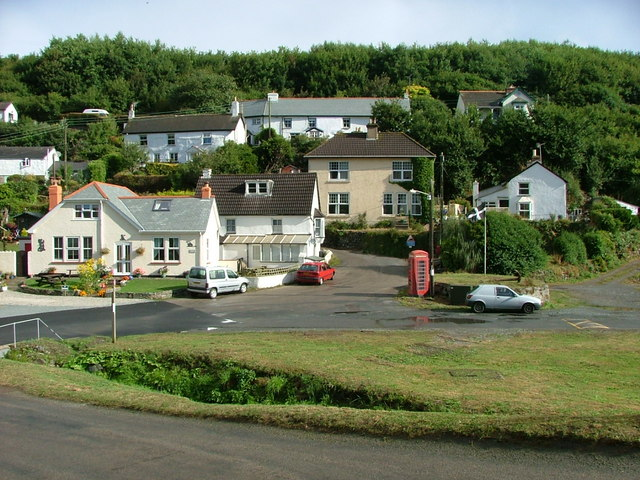

- Location within Cornwall
- Unitary authority: Cornwall
- Region: South West
- Country: England
- Sovereign state: United Kingdom
- Police: Devon and Cornwall
- Fire: Cornwall
- Ambulance: South Western

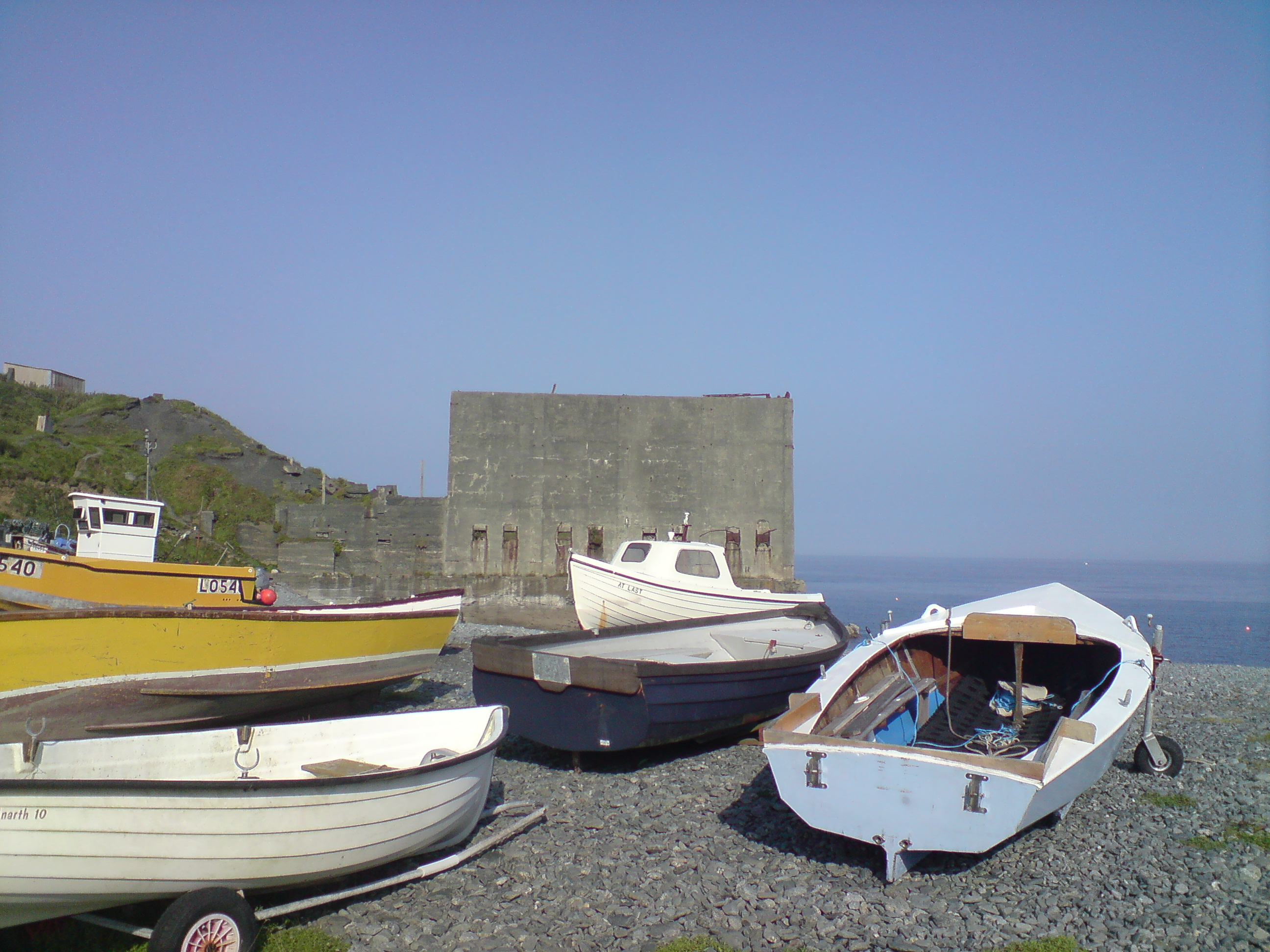
The loading silo at Porthoustock beach

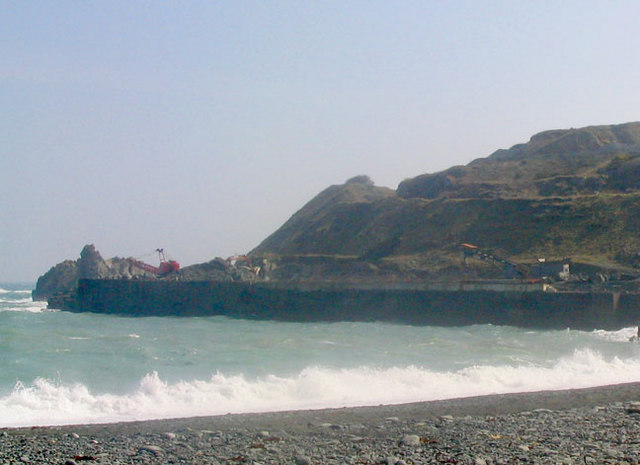
Cliffs and quarry near Porthoustock

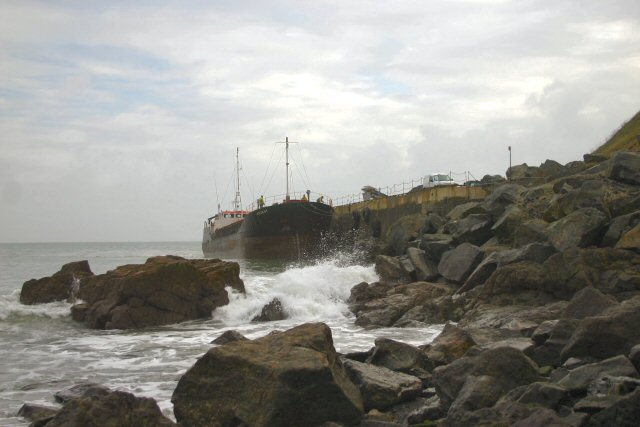
MV Ardent loading stone

Porthoustock (Cornish: Porthewstek, meaning Ewstek's cove) is a hamlet near St Keverne in Cornwall, England, United Kingdom, on the east coast of Lizard Peninsula. Aggregates are quarried nearby and Porthoustock beach is dominated by a large concrete stone silo that was once used to store stone ready to load ships but is now disused. Coastal trading ships of up to 82 metres (269 feet) can dock alongside the pier along the southern edge of the beach to be loaded with stone. Fishing boats operate from the pebble beach , with lobster and crab potting, net fishing and hand lines as the principal fishing methods. The South West Coast Path passes through Porthoustock.

Porthoustock lies within the Cornwall Area of Outstanding Natural Beauty (AONB). Almost a third of Cornwall has AONB designation, with the same status and protection as a National Park.

== History ==
Porthoustock originated as a fishing hamlet. However, from the 1890s the village developed as a port for the local stone quarries. There has been quarrying activity in Porthoustock since the late 19th century. By the 1940s the quarries were owned by Amalgamated Roadstone and provided stone to build Cornwall's wartime airfields. Porthoustock survived a German bombing raid in November 1940 with no casualties.

Porthoustock's proximity to The Manacles, a set of treacherous rocks which extend about 1-nautical-mile (1.9 km) east and south-east of Manacle Point, has been the location for numerous shipwrecks. The Royal National Lifeboat Institution (RNLI) opened Porthoustock Lifeboat Station in 1869. On 14 October 1898 the lifeboat Charlotte was launched to aid the SS Mohegan which had lost its way and hit The Manacles. It had been carrying 97 crew and 60 other people; the lifeboat saved 44 and other boats brought 7 ashore but 106 drowned. Most of the recovered bodies were buried in a mass grave at St Keverne churchyard, marked by a granite cross. The station was closed in 1942 and has since become the village hall.

== Geology ==
Fissures in the gabbro contain minerals such as analcite, epidote, hornblende, prehnite, pectolite, and calcite, some of which are rare. A gabbro tor, a natural rock formation, known as the Giant's Quoits stands on the cliffs above Porthoustock. The rocks once stood on Manacle Point but were moved to their current position in 1967 due to the expansion of the quarries. The cliffs and quarries to the south of the hamlet are designated as part of Coverack to Porthoustock SSSI (Site of Special Scientific Interest) for both their geological and biological interest.

== Economy ==
Aram Resources' West of England Quarry is adjacent to Porthoustock village. The quarry works a dark green gabbro rock mass and has its own wharf allowing the loading of aggregates directly from the quarry to ships. The wharf is protected from the prevailing southwesterly Atlantic weather systems, ensuring minimal disruption to ship loading.

== Diving ==
Porthoustock is a popular launching beach for divers en route to The Manacles and instruction in diving is available.

== Notable residents ==
- Titanic survivor Mrs Annie Margaret Hold was born in Porthoustock.
- Porthoustock resident Margaret James, was jailed for twenty years in July 2006, for the 2004 murder of parish councillor Peter Solheim.
