= Coverack =

Coastal village and fishing port in south Cornwall, England

Coordinates: 50°01′N 5°06′W

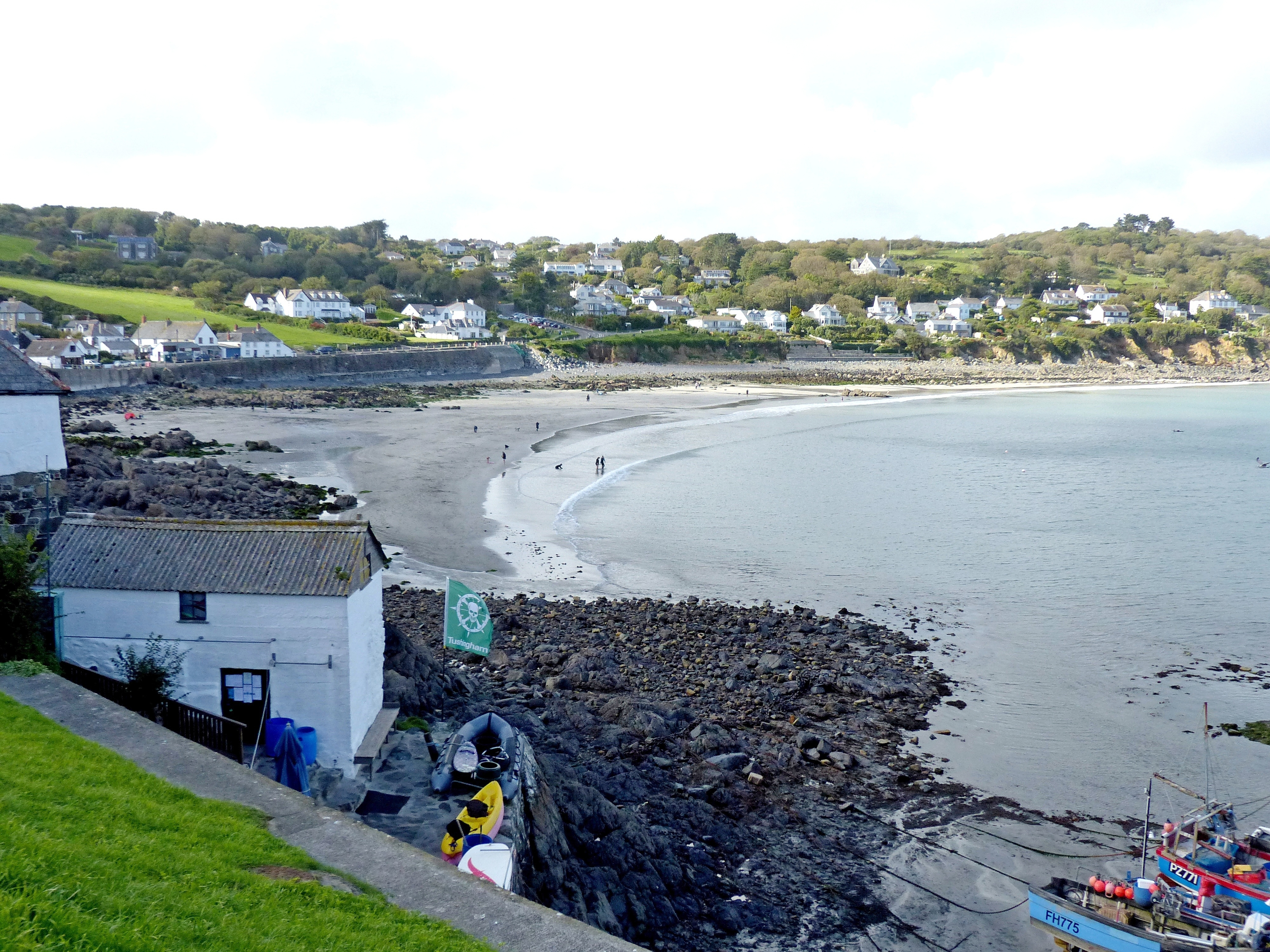
Coverack from above the harbour. The collapse of the sea wall at picture centre happened during the 18 July 2017 flood.

Coverack (Cornish: Porthkovrek, meaning cove of the stream) is a coastal village and fishing port in Cornwall, UK. It lies in the parish of St Keverne, on the east side of the Lizard peninsula about nine miles (14 km) south of Falmouth.

Coverack has several hotels and a youth hostel. The area is a centre for watersports, particularly wind surfing, sailing and diving. The nearby rocks known as the Manacles have been the site of many shipwrecks and as a consequence are now a favourite diving destination.

== Geography ==
Near the South West Coast Path is Poldowrian Garden which includes a prehistoric settlement discovered in 1965, dated by archaeologists at 5500 BC. Finds from the site are available for viewing. The roads to Coverack cross Goonhilly Downs (famous for the BT satellite earth station).

"Coverack Cove and Dolor Point" SSSI (Site of Special Scientific Interest) is one of the most famous geological localities in Cornwall, providing an almost continuous section across a mantle-crust boundary. Other nearby SSSI are Coverack to Porthoustock and Kennack to Coverack.

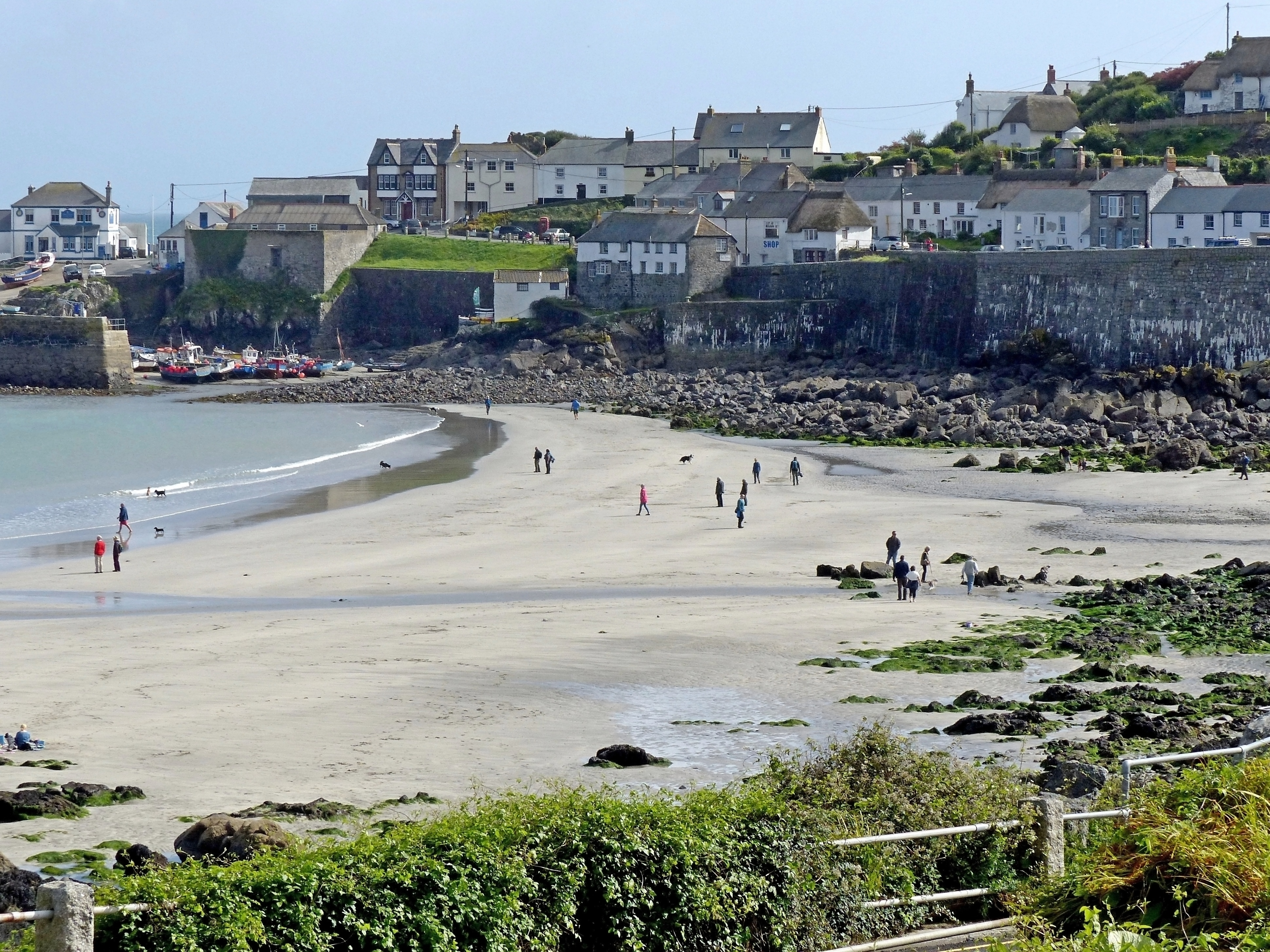
Coverack beach with the boats in the harbour in the background (2017).

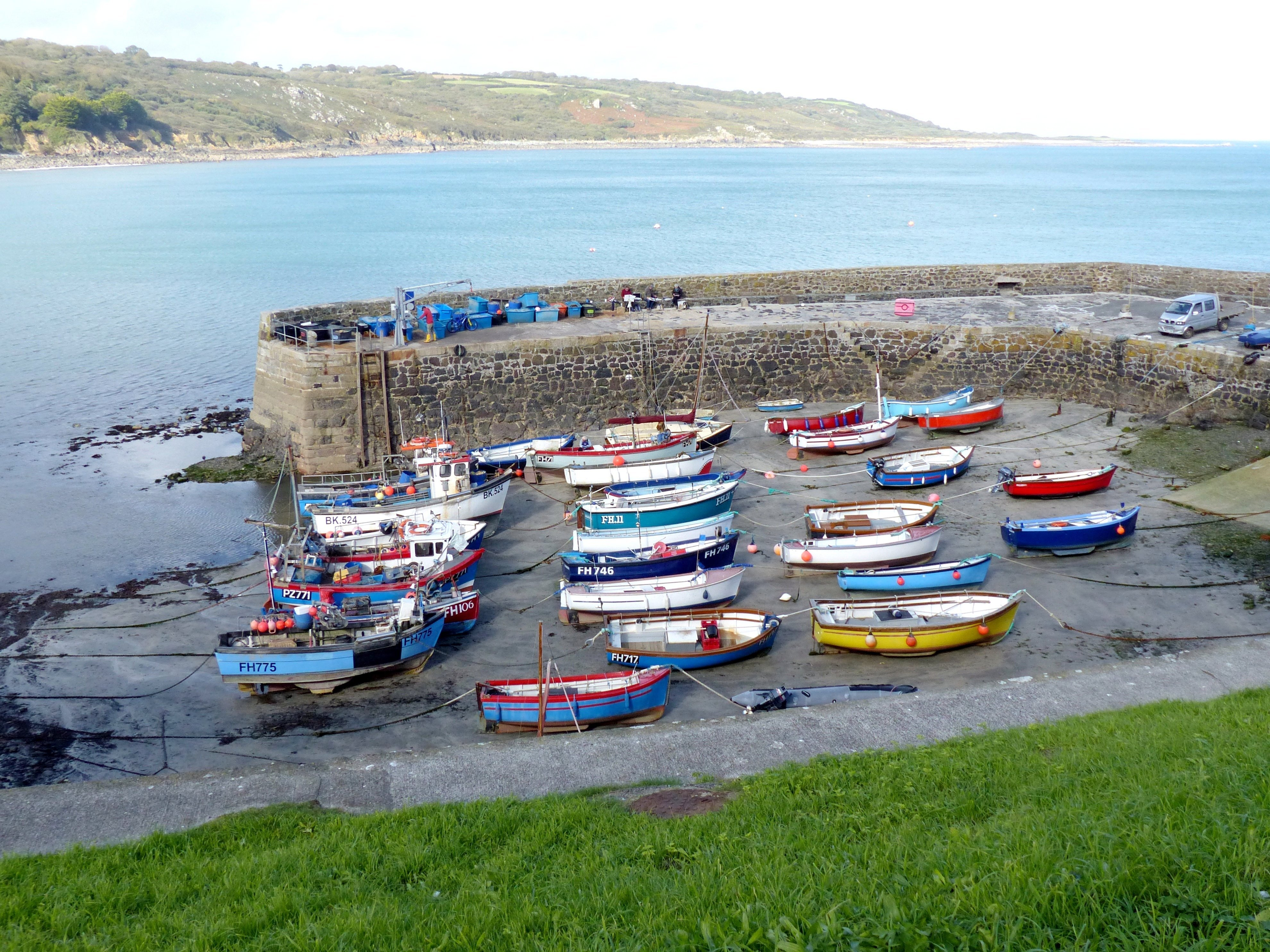
Coverack harbour (2017)

Coverack lies within the Cornwall Area of Outstanding Natural Beauty (AONB).

== History ==
=== St Peter's Church ===
St Peter's was consecrated on 20 August 1885 by the Bishop of Truro. The church overlooks the cove on land donated by Mr Trevennen and cost £500. Built in the Early English style, the footings are in local granite, the walls of red, Bridgewater brick, with the dressings of Breage granite. The village hall was built in 1885.

=== Coverack lifeboat ===
The Royal National Lifeboat Institution (RNLI) stationed a lifeboat at Coverack in 1901 following the wreck of the SS Mohegan on The Manacles in 1898 with the loss of more than 100 lives. A boat house with a slipway was built on the harbour. The all-weather lifeboat was withdrawn in May 1972 and replaced by a D-class inshore inflatable. The station was closed completely in October 1978 following the allocation of a faster boat to Falmouth Lifeboat Station.

A coxswain of the Coverack lifeboat, Archie Rowe, was a subject of This Is Your Life in 1958 when he was surprised by Eamonn Andrews at the BBC Television Theatre.

The following lifeboats were stationed at Coverack:

Dates in service	Class	ON	Op. No.	Name	Comments
1901–1934	35 ft Liverpool	ON 458		Constance Melanie	Pulling and sailing boat
1934–1954	35 ft 6in Liverpool Single engine	ON 771		The Three Sisters	Reported working as a pleasure boat at Rhyl in 2007.
1954–1972	42ft Watson	ON 907		William Taylor of Oldham	Reported working as a fishing boat named Gipsy Moth in Petit Martinique.
1972–1978	D-class (RFD PB16)		D-166	Unnamed	Inshore lifeboat.

== Christmas swim ==
Every year on Christmas Day, the villagers and holiday makers turn out to watch volunteers swim in the harbour in aid of charity. This tradition has gone on for nearly 50 years and has raised thousands of pounds for Cancer Research.

== July 2017 flash flood ==
On 18 July 2017 the village was hit by a flash flood. Roads were blocked and hailstones the size of 50 pence pieces (30 mm) smashed windows. Heavy rainfall hit at about 15:00 BST. The coastguard was needed to airlift two people who were trapped on the roof of a house.
