= Penlee Point, Mousehole =

Promontory near Penzance in Cornwall, England

Penlee Point Penn Legh (Cornish)
- Promontory
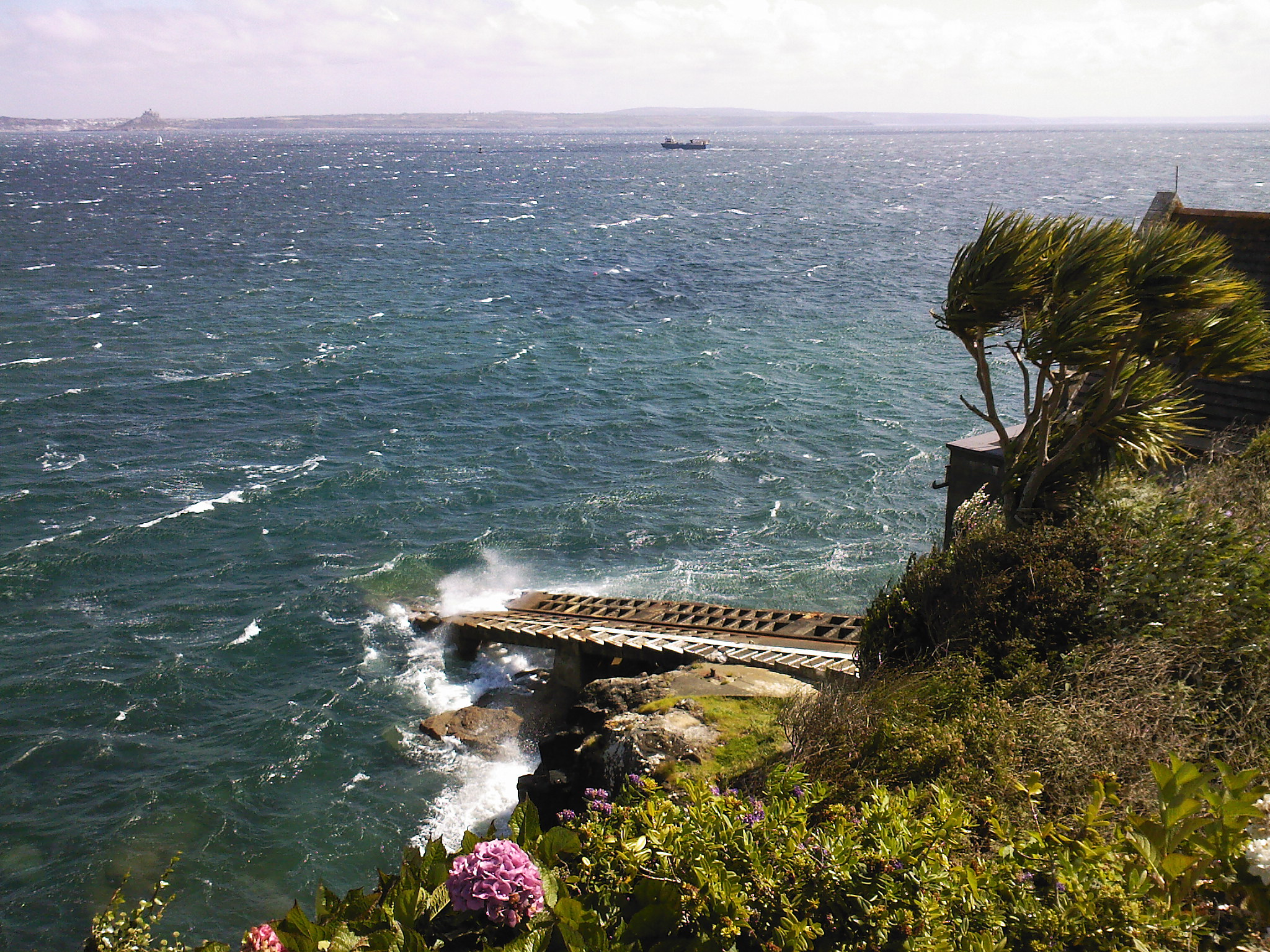
- Lifeboat Station slipway
- Interactive map of Penlee Point
- Coordinates: 50°05′17″N 5°31′55″W
- Location: Mousehole, Cornwall, England, UK

Penlee Point (Cornish: Penn Legh, meaning stone-slab headland) is a promontory near the coastal fishing village of Mousehole in west Cornwall, England, UK. It was the launching point of the Penlee lifeboat, which was lost in the disaster of 1981.

In 1883, Mr J Runnalls employed seventy people at the Penlee quarries and stone-mills. The stone was wholly used for road-making and was claimed to be one of the most durable available. On one square inch of stone, it took a pressure of 29.011 lbs to crush the stone and on one square foot, it took 1365 tons. Stone was exported to Welsh ports instead of ballast and to Bristol, Ipswich, London and Lowestoft for roads. Stone to London was taken weekly by steamer from Penzance and by sailing vessels from Mousehole.

In 1990 Penlee Point was designated a Site of Special Scientific Interest for its geological interest. The SSSI includes two small disused quarries as well as the cliff and foreshore.

== See also ==
- Penlee Point, Rame
- Penlee Quarry railway
