= The Lizard Lifeboat Station =

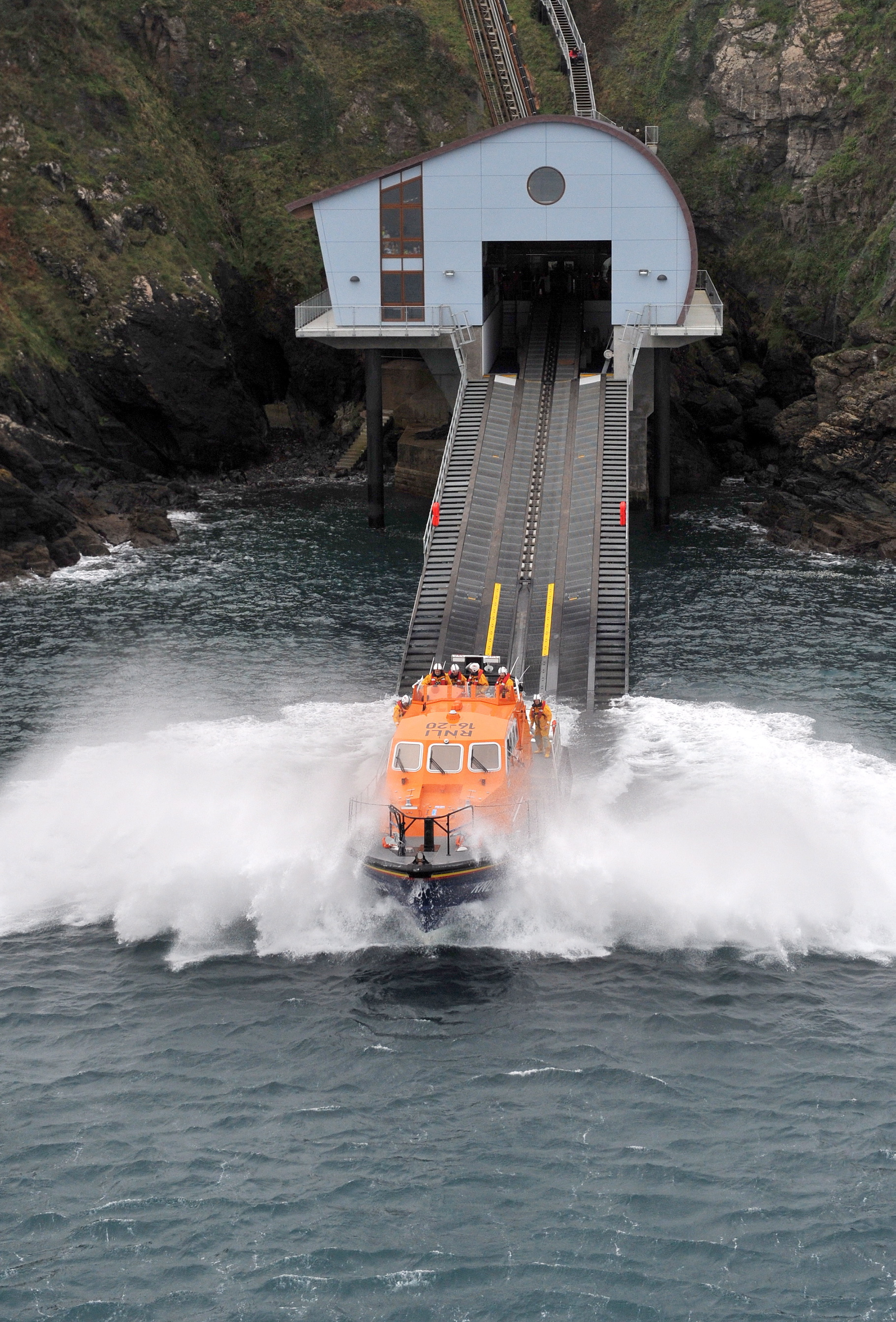
- Rose, the current Tamar-class lifeboat, launches from the RNLI lifeboat station at Kilcobben Cove, Cornwall on the Lizard.

- Location within Cornwall

General information
- Type: RNLI Lifeboat Station
- Location: Kilcobben Cove, Cornwall, England
- Coordinates: 49.96950°N 5.18718°W
- Opened: RNLI since 1859
- Owner: Royal National Lifeboat Institution

The Lizard Lifeboat Station refers to several Royal National Lifeboat Institution lifeboat stations located on the Lizard in Cornwall, United Kingdom. The first was established at the southernmost point of the peninsula in 1859. Since then successive stations have all been in operation at different locations on The Lizard. The current station is located at Kilcobben Cove 0.5 mi (0.80 km) east of the village of Lizard.

The lifeboat stations have all covered the westerly approaches to the English Channel; with up to 400 ships-a-day, it is one of the busiest shipping lanes in the world. The lifeboat service has saved many lives over the past 150 years.

== History ==
=== Polpeor Cove (1859–1961) ===
==== First station ====
The RNLI established its first lifeboat at the southern tip of The Lizard in 1859. The station, which cost £120 to build, was located atop the cliffs above Polpeor Cove about 0.6 mi (0.97 km) south of the village of Lizard. It was inaugurated after the 740-ton steamer, Czar, foundered on the Vrogue Rock, off Bass Point on 22 January 1859. The government transport ship was taking ammunition and uniforms to Malta. Fishing crews from Cadgwith and Church Cove saved some of the crew but the captain and his family drowned. Following the tragedy, a Mrs Agar of Lanhydrock donated money to buy the first Lizard Lifeboat (Anna Maria).

However the location of the first lifeboat station on the cliff above Polpeor Cove was not ideal as it made launches a long and precarious operation in rough sea and weather. On 2 January 1866 the lifeboat broke up after it was launched on exercise during a storm. It was pushed on to rocks causing the death of its Coxswain Peter Mitchell and crew members Richard Harris and Nicholas Stevens. As a tribute to the loss, the RNLI gave £130 to the local lifeboat fund. (Location: 49°57′32.53″N 5°12′22.77″W)

==== Second station ====
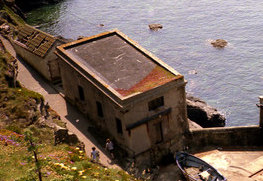
The second station was built in 1885 at Polpeor Cove.

In 1885 a larger station was built above the high-water mark lower down in Polpeor Cove to house a larger lifeboat. The existing smaller craft, Anna Maria (III), was relocated to a new station at Church Cove, just east of Lizard village. (Location: 49°57′33.51″N 5°12′24.53″W)

==== Third station ====
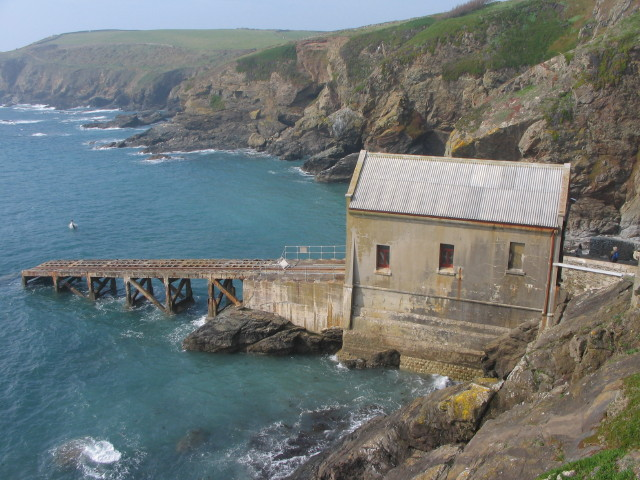
The third and final Polpeor Cove lifeboat station was built in 1914.

The final lifeboat station within Polpeor Cove was completed in 1914. The large concrete building had an integrated slipway which meant the lifeboat was able to launch directly into the sea. However this could prove hazardous in rough conditions because of the number of rocks in the cove. The exposed position of the station also meant it required a great deal of expense to maintain its general upkeep.

In order to relaunch the lifeboat, a recovery system was used to haul it back into the boat house. First ropes were places around a natural rock pillar in the sea in order to turn the stern of the boat towards land. A giant wheel – at the rear of the station – was then used to winch the boat back up the slipway.

The result of these difficulties meant the RNLI was forced to spend money repairing the station and the lifeboats from time to time. By 1958, with the need to employ larger and faster lifeboats due to the growth in maritime commerce, the RNLI decided to close Polpeor Cove because of its operating limitations. The RNLI eventually chose Kilcobben Cove as it new location for The Lizard Lifeboat station because it was sufficiently protected to allow safe launches in all conditions. Polpeor Cove closed in 1961. (Location: 49°57′33.56″N 5°12′25.57″W)

=== Cadgwith (1867–1963) ===
In 1867 the RNLI placed a second lifeboat at the fishing village of Cadgwith on the east side of the Lizard. This service ran until 1963, when it was finally closed. The station was then integrated with the service at The Lizard's Kilcobben Cove. (Location: 49°59′14.25″N 5°10′46.56″W)

=== Church Cove (1885–1899) ===
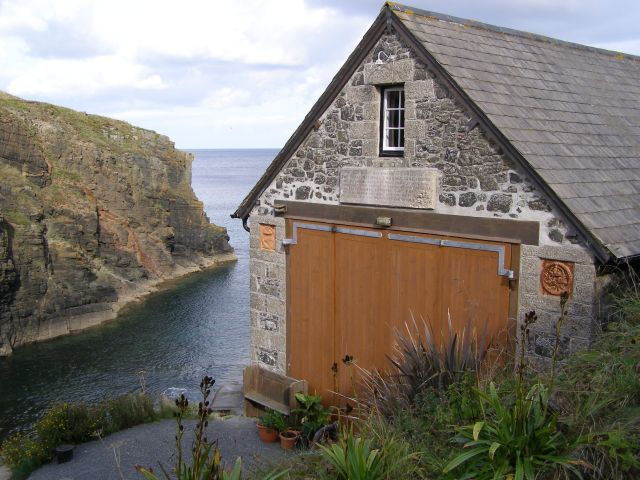
The former Church Cove Lifeboat Station in 2006.

Church Cove station, which was built at a cost of £300, opened in 1885. It housed the Anna Maria (III) lifeboat from the first station at Polpeor Cove until 1887, when she was replaced with the larger 34ft 2in John and Sarah (ON 47). Church Cove station, which was 0.4 mi (0.64 km) from the village of Landewednack was used in conjunction with the Polpeor Cove station for 14 years until it was closed and sold off in 1899. (Location: 49°58′16.49″N 5°11′18.62″W)

=== Kilcobben Cove (1961– ) ===
==== First station ====
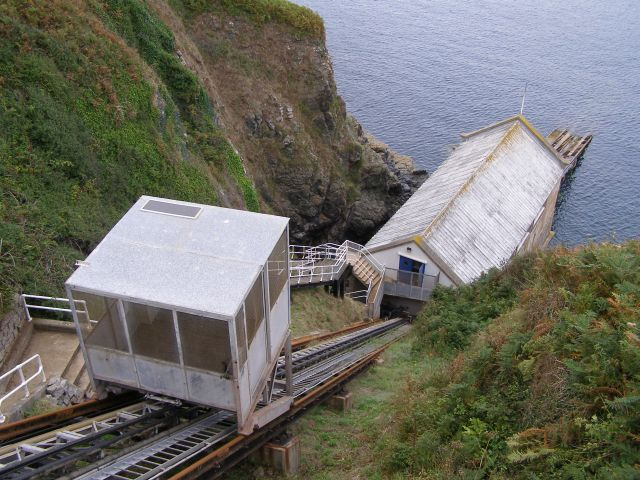
The first The Lizard RNLI lifeboat station at Kilcobben Cove, Cornwall in 2006.

The RNLI decided that a new station on The Lizard would be built at Kilcobben Cove 1.25 mi (2.01 km) east of The Lizard lighthouse. Construction was a major civil engineering project because the station and its slipway were built on a cliff just above the waterline. The station, which cost £90,000, was opened on 7 July 1961 by the Duke of Edinburgh, who also named the new Barnett-class lifeboat Duke of Cornwall (ON 952). Due to the steepness of the cliff, a funicular railway carries the lifeboat crew down to the boathouse.

The lifeboat station was originally called The Lizard-Cadgwith Lifeboat Station because it recognised the merging of the two former services based at Polpeor Cove and Cadgwith. This name was officially changed in 1987 to The Lizard Lifeboat Station. In 1988 the station and the slipway required adaptation with the arrival of a Tyne-class lifeboat called David Robinson (ON 1145).

==== Second station ====
In 2010 the original station was demolished because it could not accommodate the latest Tamar-class lifeboats. During the rebuilding the lifeboat was kept moored afloat off Cadgwith. On 5 May 2012, the new station was officially opened by Admiral the Lord Boyce, chairman of the RNLI. On the same day, the station's new Tamar-class boat, which had replaced David Robinson the year before, was named 16-20 Rose (ON 1300) in a ceremony by the-then Lord Lieutenant of Cornwall, Lady Mary Holborow.

== Lizard lifeboats ==
=== 1859 to 1960 ===
| At station | Station | ON | Name | Length | Class | Comments |
|---|---|---|---|---|---|---|
| 1859–1866 | Lizard-Polpeor | — | Anna Maria | 30 ft (9.1 m) | Peake | |
| 1866–1873 | Lizard-Polpeor | — | Anna Maria | 30 ft (9.1 m) | Self-righter | |
| 1867–1878 | Cadgwith | — | Western Commercial Traveller | 33 ft (10 m) | Self-righter | Western Commercial Traveller was renamed John Armstrong in 1878. |
| 1878–1887 | Cadgwith | — | John Armstrong | 33 ft (10 m) | Self-righter | Western Commercial Traveller was renamed John Armstrong in 1878. |
| 1873–1885 | Lizard-Polpeor | — | Anna Maria | 30 ft (9.1 m) | Self-righter | Transferred from Polpeor to the new station at Church Cove in 1885. |
| 1885–1887 | Church Cove | — | Anna Maria | 30 ft (9.1 m) | Self-righter | Transferred from Polpeor to the new station at Church Cove in 1885. |
| 1885–1903 | Lizard-Polpeor | 48 | Edmund and Fanny | 34 ft 1 in (10.39 m) | Self-righter | |
| 1887–1898 | Cadgwith | 105 | Joseph Armstrong | 37 ft 2 in (11.33 m) | Self-righter | |
| 1887–1899 | Church Cove | 47 | John and Sarah | 34 ft 2 in (10.41 m) | Self-righter | |
| 1898–1932 | Cadgwith | 416 | Minnie Moon | 39 ft (12 m) | Self-righter | |
| 1903–1918 | Lizard-Polpeor | 509 | Admiral Sir George Back | 35 ft (11 m) | Self-righter | Later stationed at Newquay. |
| 1918–1919 | Lizard-Polpeor | 628 | Sir Fitzroy Clayton | 38 ft (12 m) | Self-righter | Motor lifeboat originally stationed at Newhaven. Sold in 1935 after service at Fleetwood and used as a houseboat until 1986. |
| 1920–1934 | Lizard-Polpeor | 657 | Frederick H. Pilley | 38 ft (12 m) | Self-righter | Motor lifeboat. Later stationed at Islay and Fleetwood until sold in 1939 and became a fishing boat. |
| 1932–1940 | Cadgwith | 664 | Herbert Sturmy | 37 ft 6 in (11.43 m) | Self-righter | Originally stationed at Swanage and then Falmouth. Sold in 1941 and converted to a replica galleon. |
| 1934–1961 | Lizard-Polpeor | 769 | Duke of York | 41 ft (12 m) | Watson | Motor lifeboat. Sold in 1961 and reported to be at Wexford in 2023. |
| 1941–1963 | Cadgwith | 826 | Guide of Dunkirk | 35 ft 6 in (10.82 m) | Self-righter | Motor lifeboat. Sold and reported to be at Mevagissey in 2023. |

=== From 1961 ===
Originally known as The Lizard-Cadgwith Lifeboat Station but the name was changed in 1987 to The Lizard Lifeboat Station.

| At The Lizard | ON | Op. No. | Name | Class | Comments |
|---|---|---|---|---|---|
| 1960–1984 | 952 | — | Duke of Cornwall (Civil Service No.32) | Barnett | Later stationed at Padstow. |
| 1984–1987 | 989 | 48-02 | James and Catherine MacFarlane | Oakley | Originally stationed at Padstow and now preserved at St Mary's, Isles of Scilly. |
| 1987–1988 | 1008 | 48-005 | James and Mariska Joicey | Solent | Originally stationed at Peterhead. Sold in 1990 and modified for use as a pleasure boat, reported to be at Mylor. |
| 1988–2011 | 1145 | 47-030 | David Robinson | Tyne | Sold in 2017 and exported to Togo. |
| 2011– | 1300 | 16-20 | Rose | Tamar | |

== Station honours ==
The following are awards made at the Lizard Lifeboat Stations

Lizard (Polpeor)

- RNLI Silver Medal

Edwin Matthews, Coxswain – 1888

Captain David G Ball, Master of the Gustav Bitter – 1893

William Edward Mitchell, Coxswain – 1907
Edwin Mitchell, Second Coxswain – 1907

George Anderson, crewman, Suevic – 1907
William Williams, crewman, Suevic – 1907

- The Thanks of the Institution inscribed on Vellum

George E Mitchell, Coxswain – 1955

Cadgwith lifeboat station

- RNLI Silver Medal

Mr John Ridge – 1859

Rev N Vyvyan, Honorary Secretary – 1907
Edward Rutter, Coxswain – 1907

The Lizard lifeboat station (Formerly Lizard-Cadgwith)

- RNLI Bronze Medal

Peter Mitchell, Coxswain/Mechanic – 1985

- The Thanks of the Institution inscribed on Vellum

Philip Burgess, Coxswain – 2004

- A Collective Letter of Thanks signed by the Chairman of the Institution

Philip Burgess, Coxswain – 1993
David Hill, Second Coxswain – 1993
Roger Legge, Mechanic – 1993
John Harris, Assistant Mechanic – 1993
Michael Legge, crew member – 1993
Louis Mitchell, crew member – 1993
Richard Woodmansey, crew member – 1993
Robert Francis, crew member – 1993

- A special framed certificate

Coxswain and crew – 1979 (Fastnet Race)

- British Empire Medal

Edward Nuzum, Lifeboat Operations Manager – 2021

== See also ==
- List of RNLI stations
- Royal National Lifeboat Institution
- Royal National Lifeboat Institution lifeboats
- List of funicular railways
