= Penlee Quarry railway =

Disused railway in a quarry in Cornwall

Coordinates: 50.0959°N 5.5423°W

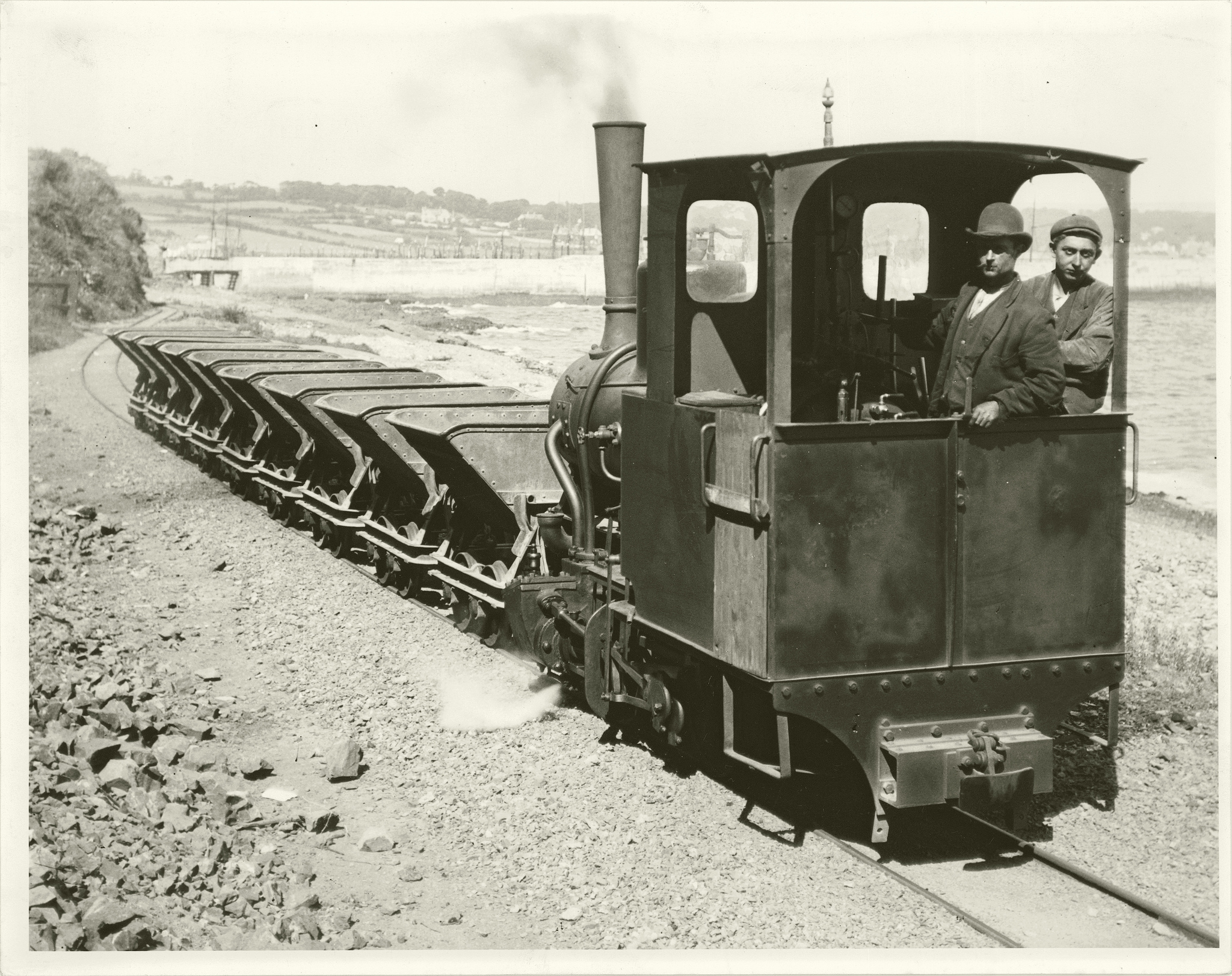
- Steam locomotive Koppel with V-skip waggons, 1906

Overview
- Headquarters: Newlyn
- Locale: Cornwall
- Dates of operation: about 1900–1973
- Successor: Abandoned

Technical
- Track gauge: 2 ft (610 mm)
- Length: 1/2 mile (0.8 km)

The Penlee Quarry railway was a 2 ft (610 mm) narrow-gauge industrial railway serving the Penlee Quarry at Newlyn in Cornwall, UK. It was Cornwall's most westerly railway and one of the last operating narrow-gauge industrial railways in the UK.

== History ==
Mineral extraction at Penlee dates back to the early 19th century, when copper, zinc and rare minerals were mined. Stone quarrying was started by James Runnalls of Penzance, at a quarry near the Old Battery in 1879. The operations were transferred to the current site at the turn of the 20th century, becoming known as Gwavas Quarry. Penlee supplied mainly aggregate (crushed stone) but on occasion also supplied large chunks of stone as rock armour ("armourstone"). The full-scale aggregate operations ran throughout most of the century, reaching peak output in the 1960s and 1970s.

With production increasing, a 2 ft (610 mm) narrow-gauge railway was opened around 1900. This connected the quarry with the south pier of Newlyn harbour, approximately ½ mile away to the east. A steam locomotive named Koppel was purchased to work this line. Internal combustion locomotives replaced steam from 1930 onwards. Stone was shipped from Newlyn to destinations around the Bristol Channel and the south coast and in later years to as far afield as Germany.

The railway was more or less straight, apart from the curve on to the south pier at Newlyn. It was double track for most of the route, although at some point in the past it had been singled, the double track being reinstated as production increased in the later years. In the 1960s when a ship was being loaded, six locomotives were needed for operations, four higher-powered ones on the main line and two lower-powered ones shunting the empty tipper wagons through the two loading points. The empty trains were reversed back to the loading points from the harbour.

In 1973, the railway ceased operations and was replaced by an electrical conveyor system using the same route. Operations at the quarry then slowed throughout the late 1970s and the 1980s, eventually coming to an end in 1989/90.

== Present day ==
Stone was supplied for a few isolated small contracts until 1994, since when the quarry has been dormant. There are now plans to use the quarry site as part of a marina and housing development.

Penlee Quarry is a Site of Special Scientific Interest, designated in 1997, noted for its geological formations and igneous rocks.

== Locomotives ==
| Name | Number | Builder | Type | Date | Works number | Notes |
|---|---|---|---|---|---|---|
| Koppel | | Stahlbahnwerke Freudenstein | 0-4-0WT | 1900 | 73 | Renamed Penlee in 1914. Withdrawn in 1946 and preserved at Newlyn harbour. Now under restoration at the Leighton Buzzard Light Railway |
| Penlee | LM1 | Kerr Stuart | 4wDM | 1930 | 4468 | Withdrawn 1961; scrapped 1965 |
| | LM2 | Hunslet | 4wDM | 1942 | 2665 | Acquired from Tarslag Ltd, Winslow in 1947; withdrawn 1958; scrapped 1965 |
| Penlee | LM3 | Hunslet | 4wDM | 1942 | 2666 | Acquired from Tarslag Ltd, Winslow in 1947; transferred to British Quarrying Co Ltd, Lydd Beach Shingle Works, Kent via Amalgamated Roadstone workshops, Malvern, Worcestershire 1954; returned to Penlee 1958; Now Yaxham Light Railway, Norfolk, No.19 Penlee, 2009 |
| | LM4 | Orenstein & Koppel | 4wDM | 1942 | 10408 | Scrapped 1953 |
| | LM24 | Ruston Hornsby | 4wDM | 1936 | 175412 | Originally at British Quarrying Co Ltd, Allington Quarry, Maidstone, Kent. Transferred from there via Amalgamated Roadstone workshops at Borough Green, Kent and Malvern, Worcestershire 1954–56; scrapped 1965 |
| | LM28 | Ruston Hornsby | 4wDM | 1944 | 229655 | Transferred from Amalgamated Roadstone workshops at Borough Green, Kent c1954; to Amalgamated Roadstone workshops Malvern, Worcestershire 1958; in 1959 at Bredonvale Products Ltd., Defford, Worcestershire; now believed to be privately preserved. |
| | LM30 | Ruston Hornsby | 4wDM | 1944 | 229656 | Transferred from Amalgamated Roadstone workshops at Malvern, Worcestershire 1961 |
| | LM37 | Ruston Hornsby | 4wDM | 1936 | 177643 | Transferred from St Keverne & Associated Quarries Ltd, Porthoustock, St Keverne, Cornwall after 1949; scrapped or sold |
| | LM38 | Hibberd | 4wDM | 1948 | 2401 | Transferred from Carreg-y-Llam Quarries Ltd, Llithfaen, Caernarvonshire 1951; to Amalgamated Roadstone workshops at Malvern, Worcestershire 1954; returned from St Keverne & Associated Quarries Ltd, Porthoustock, St Keverne, Cornwall 1961; sold for scrap 1966 |
| T.W. Lewis | LM39 | Ruston Hornsby | 4wDM | 1954 | 375316 | |
| J.W. Jenkin | LM40 | Ruston Hornsby | 4wDM | 1954 | 375315 | |
| No.2 | LM42 | Ruston Hornsby | 4wDM | 1940 | 200748 | Acquired from M.E.Engineering Ltd., Cricklewood in 1961 via the Amalgamated Roadstone workshops at Malvern, Worcestershire |
| | LM44 | Ruston Hornsby | 4wDM | 1947 | 246793 | Acquired from MacSalvors Ltd, Pool, Camborne in 1962 |
| | LM45 | Ruston Hornsby | 4wDM | 1942 | 213848 | Acquired from MacSalvors Ltd, Pool, Camborne in 1962 |
| | LM46 | Ruston Hornsby | 4wDM | 1951 | 287664 | Acquired from MacSalvors Ltd, Pool, Camborne in 1963 |
| | LM47 | Ruston Hornsby | 4wDM | 1951 | 287664 | Acquired from George Wimpey & Co Ltd, contractors, No.82, 1964 |

== See also ==
- British industrial narrow-gauge railways
