= The Manacles =

Set of treacherous rocks off The Lizard peninsula in Cornwall

The Manacles Meyn Eglos (Cornish)
- Reef
- Nautical chart of the approaches to Falmouth

- Location within Cornwall
- Coordinates: 50.04462°N 5.04616°W
- Location: Cornwall, UK

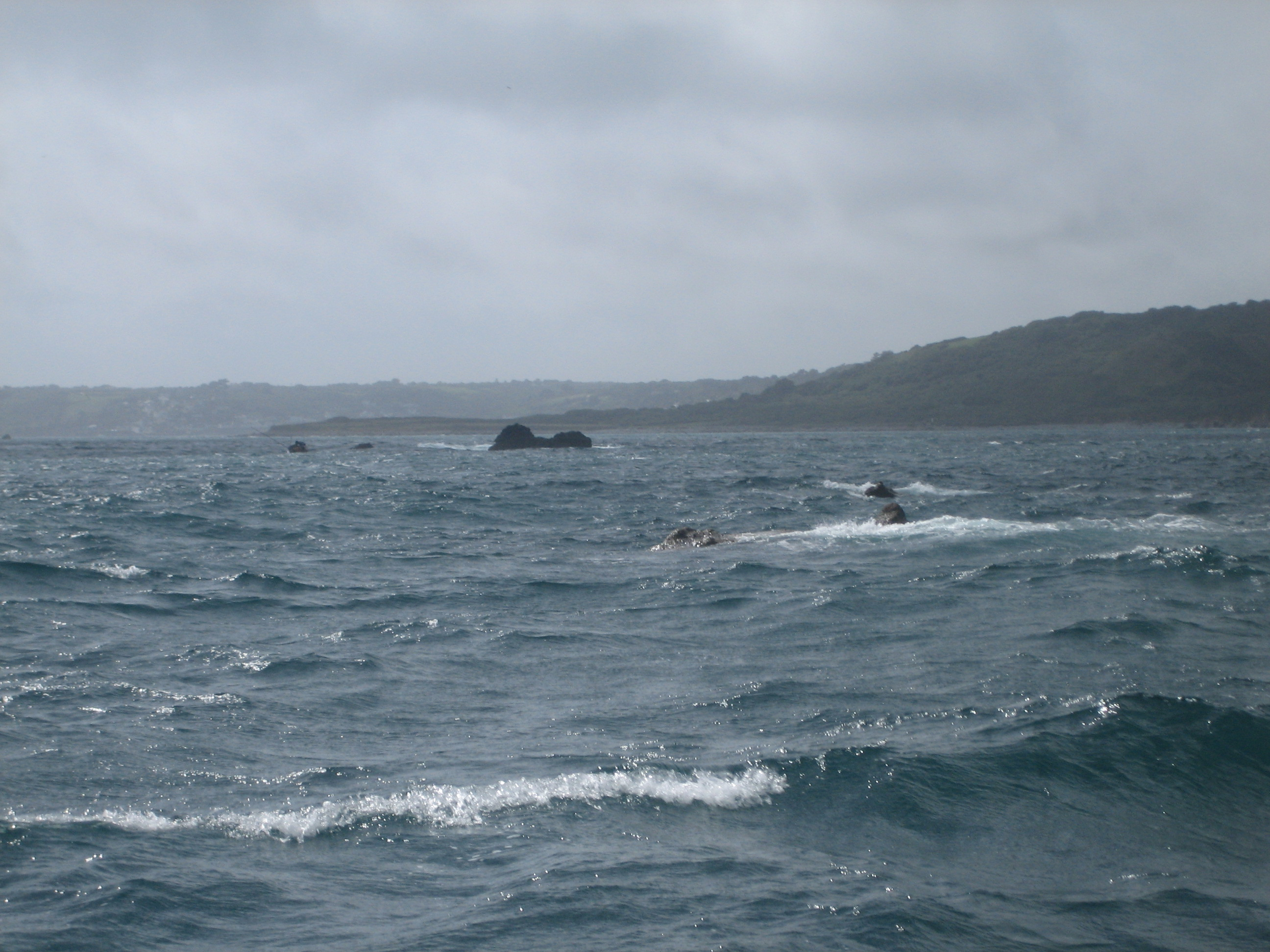
The Manacles (Carn-du and Moen Voes) looking south west towards Coverack

The Manacles (Cornish: Meyn Eglos, meaning church stones) (grid reference SW820205) are a set of treacherous rocks off The Lizard peninsula in Cornwall. The rocks are rich in marine wildlife and they are a popular spot for diving due to the many shipwrecks. Traditionally pronounced mean-a'klz (1808), the name derives from the Cornish meyn eglos (church stones), the top of St Keverne church spire being visible from the area.

== Geography ==
The rocks are in Falmouth Bay and extend about 1-nautical-mile (1.9 km) east and south-east of Manacle Point, on the east coast of the Lizard Peninsula. The nearest village is Porthoustock. The reef consists of many submerged rocks and several groups of rocks that break the surface, although some only do so at low water. The Middle Manacles in the north consist of Maen Chynoweth or Morah (Cornish: Morhogh, meaning dolphin), Chyronos, Maen Gerrick and the Gwinges, the eastern group has Vase Rock and Pen Vin, the large group in the centre include the Minstrel Rock, Carn-dhu, Maen Voes (the Voices) and the Quants and Maen Land is in the south-west.

== Marine Conservation Zone ==
The Manacles Marine Conservation Zone was designated on 21 November 2013 and covers an area of approximately 3.5-square-kilometre (1.4 sq mi). The MCZ extends from Porthoustock Point south to Polcries and extends 2 kilometres (1.2 mi) from the coastline. The seabed varies within the site and includes rocky reefs, vertical rock faces, subtidal sand and intertidal coarse sediment. The sediments in shallow water support Maerl beds. Maerl is a collective term for several species of red seaweed which have a hard, chalky skeleton. It can be an important habitat for juvenile animals, anemones, sea cucumbers and sea urchins.

== Shipwrecks ==
There have been over a thousand lives lost from more than one hundred ships that have been wrecked on The Manacles. The reef lying on the eastern approach to the port of Falmouth is one reason for the large number of wrecks, although some ships such as SS Mohegan were many miles off course when they ploughed into the rocks.

Many of the well-known wrecks are in the central group where depths are less than 6 metres (20 ft) for an area of 300 by 200 metres (980 by 660 ft). These wrecks include:

- HMS Primrose, an 18-gun Cruizer-class brig-sloop, sank on 22 January 1809, with only one of the 126 on board surviving.
- The John carrying 263 emigrants to Canada, sank on the Maen Land in May 1855, only 86 survived.
- Spyridon Vagliano, a Greek steamer carrying grain from Novorossijsk to Falmouth sank on 8 February 1890 with the loss of 14 of the 22 crew.
- SS Mohegan sank on 14 October 1898 with 106 fatalities. Imortalised by the Dundonian poet William McGonagall in his poem "The Wreck of the Steamer Mohegan."

In 1885 Trinity House was petitioned for a lightship to be moored near the rocks. Over the previous ten years, sixteen vessels, with 693 crew and passengers had been wrecked and the value of the ships and their cargoes was estimated to be about £100,000. The Trinity House board decided, in May 1890, that they did not see any necessity for either the siting of a lightship, or building a lighthouse.
