= List of shipwrecks in January 1859 =

The list of shipwrecks in January 1859 includes ships sunk, foundered, grounded, or otherwise lost during January 1859.

== 1 January ==
List of shipwrecks: 1 January 1859
Ship	State	Description
Henry Gardner	United Kingdom	The ship ran aground on the Cleet Reef, off Graemsay, Orkney Islands. She was on a voyage from Sunderland, County Durham to Aden. She was refloated on 7 January.
Louisa	France	The ship was wrecked on the Isle of Pines, Cuba. Her crew were rescued. She was on a voyage from Marseille, Bouches-du-Rhône to New Orleans, Louisiana, United States.
Russell	United Kingdom	The ship was driven ashore at North Somercotes, Lincolnshire. She was on a voyage from Littlehampton, Sussex to Sunderland, County Durham.

== 2 January ==
List of shipwrecks: 2 January 1859
Ship	State	Description
Elizabeth	United Kingdom	The schooner was driven ashore at Rattray Head, Aberdeenshire. She was on a voyage from Thurso, Caithness to Sunderland, County Durham. She was refloated and taken in to Peterhead, Aberdeenshire in a leaky condition.
La Plata	Sweden	The brig ran aground on the Goodwin Sands, Kent, United Kingdom She was on a voyage from Gothenburg to Pernambuco, Brazil. She was refloated and resumed her voyage, but put in to Cowes, Isle of Wight, United Kingdom on 6 January in a leaky condition.
Luca Padre	United Kingdom	The ship ran aground on the Indian Bank, in the Irish Sea.
Maria Margaretta	Denmark	The ship ran aground on the Andrews Shoal, in the North Sea off the coast of Suffolk, United Kingdom. She was on a voyage from the Agger Canal to London, United Kingdom. She was refloated and taken in to Harwich, Essex, United Kingdom in a leaky condition.
Orda	Prussia	The brig struck a sunken rock and was holed. She was on a voyage from Memel to Grimsby, Lincolnshire, United Kingdom, She put in to Grimstad, Norway in a leaky condition.

== 3 January ==
List of shipwrecks: 3 January 1859
Ship	State	Description
Admiral Nelson	United Kingdom	The schooner was driven ashore at Bacton, Norfolk. She was on a voyage from Hartlepool, County Durham to London. She was refloated and resumed her voyage in a leaky condition, but consequently put in to Lowestoft, Suffolk on 9 January in a leaky condition.
Asia, and Matilda	Stralsund; United Kingdom	The barque Asia collided with Matilda in the English Channel. Both vessels were beached at Dungeness, Kent. Asia was on a voyage from Stralsund to Melbourne, Victoria. She was refloated and taken in to port. Matilda was on a voyage from South Shields, County Durham to Shoreham-by-Sea, Sussex. She was refloated and taken in to Ramsgate, Kent.
Great Conquest	United Kingdom	The tug was driven ashore whilst on a voyage from Holyhead, Anglesey to Liverpool, Lancashire. She was refloated and taken in to Liverpool waterlogged at the bows.
Pioneer	United Kingdom	The ship ran aground on the Upper Humphrey's Rocks, on the Kent coast. She was on a voyage from Bristol, Gloucestershire to London. She was refloated and resumed her voyage.
Williams	United Kingdom	The brig was driven ashore at Bacton. She was refloated and found to be leaky.

== 4 January ==
List of shipwrecks: 4 January 1859
Ship	State	Description
Arend	Norway	The ship was driven ashore at Hellevoetsluis, Zeeland, Netherlands. She was refloated.
Cummings	United Kingdom	The barque was wrecked on the Leman Sand. Her crew were rescued by the Leman and Ower Lightship ( Trinity House).
C. Vanderbilt	United States	The ship was wrecked on Fisher's Island, off Cape Race, Newfoundland, British North America. All on board survived.
Dneiper	Flag unknown	The steamship was driven ashore at Gallipoli, Ottoman Empire. She became a wreck in November.
Ellen	United Kingdom	The brig ran aground in Gibraltar Bay. She was on a voyage from Tenedos, Ottoman Empire to Queenstown, County Cork. She was refloated and taken in to Gibraltar in a leaky condition.
Exchange	United Kingdom	The schooner was driven ashore at Whitby, Yorkshire. She was on a voyage from Hartlepool, County Durham to Southwold, Suffolk. She was refloated and taken in to Whitby.
Ipapandia	Ottoman Empire	The brig ran aground on the Kentish Knock. Her crew were rescued by the Kentish Knock Lightship ( Trinity House). She was on a voyage from Newcastle upon Tyne, Northumberland, United Kingdom to Civitavecchia, Papal States. She was refloated and towed in to Ramsgate, Kent, United Kingdom by at tug.
Johanne	Denmark	The ship foundered.
Koh-i-Noor	India	The ship caught fire at Cochin and was scuttled.
Malenina	France	The steamship was wrecked at Bône, Algeria. She was on a voyage from Tunis, Beylik of Tunis to Malta and Marseille, Bouches-du-Rhône.
Melona	United Kingdom	The brig ran aground on the Sizewell Bank, in the North Sea off the coast of Suffolk. She was on a voyage from South Shields, County Durham to London. She was refloated and resumed her voyage.
Skimmer of the Seas	United Kingdom	The ship was driven ashore near St. Margaret's Bay, Kent.. She was refloated and taken in to Deal, Kent.
Vrouw Jantje	Kingdom of Hanover	The galiot ran aground in the Nieuw Diep. Her crew were rescued. She was on a voyage from "Randervien" to London.
Weasel	United Kingdom	The ship was driven ashore near St. Margaret's Bay. She was refloated and taken in to Deal.

== 5 January ==
List of shipwrecks: 5 January 1859
Ship	State	Description
Dumfries	United Kingdom	The steamship ran aground in the River Nith. She was on a voyage from Dumfries to Liverpool, Lancashire.
Falcon	United Kingdom	The tug ran aground and was wrecked south of Sunderland, County Durham.
Lord Panmure	United Kingdom	The steamship was run down and sunk in the Swin by the steamship Derwent (United Kingdom). Her crew were rescued. She was on a voyage from London to Newcastle upon Tyne, Northumberland.
Molly	Russia	The schooner was wrecked on the Scroby Sands, Norfolk, United Kingdom. Her crew were rescued by the lifeboat Prince Albert (United Kingdom). Molly was on a voyage from Newcastle upon Tyne to Castellamare del Golfo, Sicily.

== 6 January ==
List of shipwrecks: 6 January 1859
Ship	State	Description
Eugenie	United Kingdom	The schooner was driven ashore and wrecked at Blakeney, Norfolk. Her crew were rescued. She was on a voyage from Middlesbrough, Yorkshire to Ghent, East Flanders, Belgium.
Good Intent	United Kingdom	The schooner collided with Eliza and sank in the Irish Sea 10 nautical miles (19 km) north west of the North West Lightship ( Trinity House). Her crew were rescued by Eliza. Good Intent was on a voyage from Liverpool, Lancashire to Faversham, Kent.
Hazard	United Kingdom	The schooner was driven ashore at Staithes, Yorkshire.
Seaton	United Kingdom	The steamship was driven ashore at Lowestoft, Suffolk. She was on a voyage from London to Sunderland, County Durham. She was refloated on 8 January and resumed her voyage.

== 7 January ==
List of shipwrecks: 7 January 1859
Ship	State	Description
Axa	United Kingdom	The ship ran aground on the Falsterbo Reef, in the Baltic Sea. She was on a voyage from Stettin to Gothenburg, Sweden. She was refloated and put in to Helsingør, Denmark for repairs.
Franklin	United Kingdom	The barque capsized in the Atlantic Ocean with the loss of three lives. Survivors were rescued on 10 January by Manhattan (United States). She was on a voyage from Pensacola, Florida, United States to Queenstown, County Cork.
Mary	United Kingdom	The brigantine was wrecked on the Irish coast. Her crew were rescued by Edward Whelan (United Kingdom).
Meg Merrilees	United Kingdom	The ship was driven ashore at Great Yarmouth, Norfolk.
Nautilus	United Kingdom	The brig was driven ashore at Havre de Grâce, Seine-Inférieure, France. She was on a voyage from Newcastle upon Tyne, Northumberland to Havre de Grâce. She was refloated and taken in to Havre de Grâce in a severely leaky condition.
Prospect	United Kingdom	The brig was lost off "Galete Island". Her crew were rescued. She was on a voyage from Marianopoli, Sicily to Hull, Yorkshire.
Providence	United Kingdom	The brig ran aground at the mouth of the River Tyne. She was on a voyage from Bremen to South Shields, County Durham. She was refloated and taken in to South Shields in a leaky condition.
Rebecca	United States	The barque was wrecked on the Aguada Shoals. Her crew were rescued. She was on a voyage from Newport, Monmouthshire, United Kingdom to Jamaica.
Sarah	United Kingdom	The sloop sprang a leak off the Farne Islands, Northumberland. She was run ashore at North Sunderland, County Durham, where she was wrecked. Her crew were rescued. She was on a voyage from Grangemouth, Stirlingshire to South Shields.
Seaton	United Kingdom	The steamship was driven ashore at Lowestoft, Suffolk. She was refloated and taken in to Lowestoft.
Stella	United Kingdom	The schooner collided with the full-rigged ship Strathleven (United Kingdom) 27 nautical miles (50 km) east of the Tuskar Rock and was abandoned by four of her six crew, who were rescued by Strathleven. Stella was on a voyage from Livorno, Grand Duchy of Tuscany to Dublin. She was towed in to Waterford in a leaky condition.
St. Fort	United Kingdom	The ship was driven ashore and wrecked "on the west coast of Ikanoe". She was on a voyage from Antwerp, Belgium to Leith, Lothian.
Talavera	United Kingdom	The ship ran aground off Tranquebar, India. She was refloated and found to be leaky. She was taken in to Trincomalee, Ceylon for repairs.

== 8 January ==
List of shipwrecks: 8 January 1859
Ship	State	Description
Auguste Louise	France	The steamship collided with the steamship Emerald (United Kingdom) in the River Clyde and was beached at Garvel Point. Subsequently refloated and taken in to Greenock, Renfrewshire, United Kingdom where she was repaired by Robert Steele & Company.
Briseis	United Kingdom	The ship was destroyed by fire in the South Atlantic (20°52′S 33°15′W). Her crew survived. She was on a voyage from Gravesend, Kent to Vancouver Island, British Columbia, British North America.
Caroline Daly	United Kingdom	The ship was driven ashore at Margate, Kent. She was on a voyage from London to Bristol, Gloucestershire. She was refloated the next day and taken in to Ramsgate, Kent in a waterlogged condition.
Corcyra	United Kingdom	The brig was driven ashore at Ness Point, Suffolk. She was refloated the next day and towed in to Lowestoft, Suffolk.
Druide	France	The barque was driven ashore at Blakeney, Norfolk, United Kingdom. Her crew were rescued. She was on a voyage from Fredrikshavn, Denmark to Havre de Grâce, Seine-Inférieure.
Earl of Caithness	United Kingdom	The steamship ran aground at Aberdeen. All on board, more than 40 people, were rescued by the Aberdeen Lifeboat. She was on a voyage from Grantown-on-Spey, Moray to Wick, Caithness. She was refloated in late January and take in to Aberdeen.
Garril	United Kingdom	The brigantine ran aground and was damaged at Dungarvan, County Waterford. She was on a voyage from Brăila, Ottoman Empire to Dungarvan.
Helen Wallace	United Kingdom	The ship ran aground in the Hooghly River. She was on a voyage from Calcutta, India to Liverpool, Lancashire. She was refloated and resumed her voyage.
Propeller	United Kingdom	The steamship ran aground and sank at Kinmore Point. She was refloated on 15 January and taken in to Galway.
Sarah	United Kingdom	The sloop was driven ashore and severely damaged at Berwick upon Tweed, Northumberland.
Sir Edward Banks	United Kingdom	The ship was driven onto the Herd Sand, in the North Sea off the coast of County Durham. Her crew were rescued by the North Shields Lifeboat. She was on a voyage from Hartlepool, County Durham to Aberdeen. She subsequently became a wreck.

== 9 January ==
List of shipwrecks: 9 January 1859
Ship	State	Description
Betsey	United Kingdom	The schooner was driven ashore at Newbiggin, Northumberland. Her four crew were rescued by the Newbiggin Lifeboat. Shw was refloated and taken in to Newbiggin.
Crown	United Kingdom	The brig was run down and sunk in the River Thames by a Dutch steamship. Her crew were rescued.
Dodo	United Kingdom	The steamship ran aground at Cork. She was on a voyage from Liverpool, Lancashire to Cork.
Hazard	United Kingdom	The schooner was driven ashore and wrecked at Staithes, Yorkshire.
Ida	United Kingdom	The ship ran aground at Lowestoft, Suffolk. She was reported to be on a voyage from Sunderland to Seaham, County Durham. She was refloated and resumed her voyage.
Lydia	United Kingdom	The schooner foundered off Happisburgh, Norfolk. Her crew were rescued. She was on a voyage from Newcastle upon Tyne, Northumberland to Boulogne, Pas-de-Calais, France.

== 10 January ==
List of shipwrecks: 10 January 1859
Ship	State	Description
Marianne	Danzig	The lighter sank at Danzig with the loss of fifteen lives.
Saxon King	United Kingdom	The barque ran aground on the Cannon Rock. She was on a voyage from Samarang, Netherlands East Indies to the River Clyde She was refloated and resumed her voyage in a severely leaky condition, having taken on extra hands, but consequently sank off Stranraer, Wigtownshire on 12 December. Her crew were rescued.

== 11 January ==
List of shipwrecks: 11 January 1859
Ship	State	Description
Abdalia	United Kingdom	The ship was abandoned in the Atlantic Ocean 40 nautical miles (74 km) west of Barra Head, Outer Hebrides. Her crew were rescued. She was on a voyage from Glasgow, Renfrewshire to Bombay, India.
Agnes	United Kingdom	The schooner was driven ashore and wrecked at Eyemouth, Berwickshire. She was on a voyage from Newcastle upon Tyne, Northumberland to Perth.
Blossom	United Kingdom	The ship struck the Plough Seat and was then driven ashore at Lindisfarne, Northumberland. She was on a voyage from Sunderland, County Durham to Arbroath, Forfarshire. She was refloated.
Catania	United Kingdom	The ship was wrecked at Catania, Sicily. Her crew were rescued.
Einigkeit	Prussia	The ship was driven ashore and wrecked at Pillau.
Jane	Denmark	The ship sank south of the entrance to the Mareagher Fjord. Her crew were rescued.
Jane	United Kingdom	The barque was wrecked at Catania. Her crew were rescued.
Sappho	United Kingdom	The schooner was wrecked at Catania. Her crew were rescued.
Sir George Anderson	United Kingdom	The barque was driven ashore at Thisted, Denmark. Her crew were rescued. She was on a voyage from Glückstadt, Duchy of Schleswig to Hartlepool, County Durham.
Vesper	United Kingdom	The ship foundered in the "Guspel Straits". Her crew were rescued. She was on a voyage from London to Singapore, Straits Settlements.

== 12 January ==
List of shipwrecks: 12 January 1859
Ship	State	Description
Delia	Russia	The ship was driven ashore at Rügenwaldermünde, Prussia. She was on a voyage from Liepāja to Dundee, Forfarshire, United Kingdom. She was refloated on 5 May and taken in to Stolpmünde, Prussia.

== 13 January ==
List of shipwrecks: 13 January 1859
Ship	State	Description
Carl August	Danzig	The barque was driven ashore on "Rosettern", off the coast of the Courland Governorate. She was on a voyage from Grimsby, Lincolnshire, United Kingdom to Danzig.
Gudrun	Denmark	The brig was driven ashore at the entrance to the Agger Canal. She was on a voyage from Hamburg to Newcastle upon Tyne, Northumberland, United Kingdom. She was refloated.
Peruvian	United Kingdom	The barque was driven ashore and wrecked at Gallows Point, British Honduras. She was on a voyage from Belize City, British Honduras to Queenstown, County Cork.

== 14 January ==
List of shipwrecks: 14 January 1859
Ship	State	Description
Cachalot	Russia	The steamship driven ashore and wrecked near Adra, Spain. She was on a voyage from Liverpool, Lancashire, United Kingdom to Genoa, Kingdom of Sardinia.
Sutlej	India	The ship caught fire and sank in the Hooghly River with the loss of five of her crew. She was on a voyage from Calcutta to London.

== 15 January ==
List of shipwrecks: 15 January 1859
Ship	State	Description
Clorinda	United Kingdom	The ship was driven ashore and wrecked in Saint George Bay with the loss of two of her crew. She was consequently condemned.
Dream	United Kingdom	The schooner was driven ashore at Smyrna, Ottoman Empire. She was on a voyage from Smyrna to Falmouth, Cornwall. She was refloated.
Lene	United Kingdom	The ship was wrecked at Fredrikshavn, Denmark.
Maid of Orleans	United Kingdom	The ship was driven ashore in Saint George Bay with the loss of a crew member. She was consequently condemned.
Mary	United Kingdom	The brig was driven ashore at Redcar, Yorkshire. She was on a voyage from South Shields, County Durham to London. She was refloated and put back to South Shields in a leaky condition.
Meggy	United Kingdom	The ship was driven ashore in Saint George Bay. Her crew were rescued. She was consequently condemned.
Morning Star	United Kingdom	The ship was driven ashore and wrecked in Saint George Bay.
Porto Novo	United Kingdom	The ship was destroyed by fire at Bristol, Gloucestershire.
Star	United Kingdom	The brig was driven ashore and wrecked in Saint George Bay. Her crew were rescued.
Usworth	United Kingdom	The ship was driven ashore and wrecked at St. Jean d'Acre, Ottoman Syria.
Whalton	United Kingdom	The ship was driven ashore in Saint George Bay. Her crew were rescued. She was consequently condemned.

== 16 January ==
List of shipwrecks: 16 January 1859
Ship	State	Description
Alacrity	United Kingdom	The brig ran aground on the Perney Steel, on the coast of Yorkshire. She was on a voyage from Blyth, Northumberland to London. She was refloated and resumed her voyage.
Emanuel Boutcher	United Kingdom	The ship ran aground on the Sizewell Bank, in the North Sea off the coast of Suffolk. She was on a voyage from Hartlepool, County Durham to London. She was refloated and assisted in to Lowestoft, Suffolk in a leaky condition.
Liverpool	United Kingdom	The schooner was driven ashore at Formby Point, Lancashire.
Maria	Spain	The schooner was wrecked on the Brotharen Rocks, in the Shetland Islands, United Kingdom. Her crew were rescued. She was on a voyage from Kristiansand, Norway to Santander.
Northumbria	United Kingdom	The steamship ran aground on the Banjaard Sand, in the North Sea off the coast of, Zeeland, Netherlands. She was refloated the nexty and taken in to Brouwershaven, Zeeland or Bremerhaven. Northumbria was on a voyage from Java, Netherlands East Indies to Rotterdam, South Holland, Netherlands.
Peace	United Kingdom	The ship ran aground on the Carse Bank, in the Solway Firth and was severely damaged. She was on a voyage from Port Carlisle, Cumberland to Liverpool, Lancashire.
Zealous	United Kingdom	The ship ran aground on the Barber Sand, in the North Sea off the coast of Suffolk. She was on a voyage from Boulogne, Pas-de-Calais, France to Amble, Northumberland. She was refloated.

== 17 January ==
List of shipwrecks: 17 January 1859
Ship	State	Description
Ganymede	United Kingdom	The ship capsized at Newport, Monmouthshire and was severely damaged. She was on a voyage from Bristol, Gloucestershire to Lisbon, Portugal.
Joseph and Elizabeth	United Kingdom	The brig ran aground on the Upgang Rock. She was refloated and taken in to Whitby, Yorkshire, where she sank. She was on a voyage from Dieppe, Seine-Inférieure, France to Whitby.
Perseverance	United Kingdom	The ship ran aground at Blyth, Northumberland. She was on a voyage from Hull, Yorkshire to the River Tyne. She was refloated.

== 18 January ==
List of shipwrecks: 18 January 1859
Ship	State	Description
Aurora	(United Kingdom of Great Britain and Ireland) Jersey	The brigantine ran aground and was wrecked at Caernarfon. She was on a voyage from Demerara, British Guiana to Liverpool, Lancashire.
Eliza Pickering	United Kingdom	The schooner was driven ashore in Carnarvon Bay. Her crew were rescued. She was on a voyage from Rouen, Seine-Inférieure, France to Belfast, County Antrim.
Kate Weston	United States	The schooner was driven ashore near Paraíba, Brazil. She was on a voyage from New York to Pernambuco, Brazil.
Westerbotton	Sweden	The barque ran aground on the Goodwin Sands, Kent, United Kingdom. She was on a voyage from Calcutta, India to Hamburg.
Wild Flower	United Kingdom	The ship was wrecked near Ragusa, Sicily with the loss of all hands. She was on a voyage from Newport, Monmouthshire to Venice, Kingdom of Lombardy–Venetia.

== 19 January ==
List of shipwrecks: 19 January 1859
Ship	State	Description
Atlas	Netherlands	The ship was wrecked on the Lagulhas Reef. She was on a voyage from Batavia to a Dutch port.
Nancies	United Kingdom	The brig was wrecked at Irvine, Ayrshire with the loss of one of her five crew.

== 20 January ==
List of shipwrecks: 20 January 1859
Ship	State	Description
Lillie Mills	United States	The ship ran aground on a reef off Bahía Honda, Cuba. She was on a voyage from Trinidad to Boston, Massachusetts. She was refloated.
Queen	United Kingdom	The ship partly sank at Dover, Kent. She was on a voyage from Calais, France to Dover.
William Frazer	United Kingdom	The ship ran aground on the Barber Sand, in the North Sea off the coast of Norfolk.
Yemassee	United States	The ship was driven ashore at Orbost, Isle of Skye, United Kingdom. She was on a voyage from Liverpool, Lancashire, United Kingdom to Philadelphia, Pennsylvania. She had become a wreck by 24 January.

== 21 January ==
List of shipwrecks: 21 January 1859
Ship	State	Description
Come On	United Kingdom	The brig ran aground on the Newcombe Sand, in the North Sea off the coast of Suffolk. She was on a voyage from Sunderland, County Durham to the West Indies. She was refloated and taken in to Lowestoft, Suffolk in a leaky condition, subsequently returning to Sunderland having taken on extra hands.
Czar	United Kingdom	The 740-ton government transport ship was wrecked on the Vrogue Rocks, off Bass Point, The Lizard, Cornwall. The coastguard from Cadgwith and Church Cove saved seventeen people but the captain and twelve others drowned. Czar was on a voyage from Hull, Yorkshire to Malta with a cargo of ammunition and uniforms.
London	United Kingdom	The ship was driven ashore at Beachy Head, Sussex. She was on a voyage from New York, United States to London. She was refloated.

== 23 January ==
List of shipwrecks: 23 January 1859
Ship	State	Description
Lifeguard	United Kingdom	The steamship ran aground on the Holme Sand, in the North Sea off the coast of Suffolk. She was refloated and resumed her voyage.

== 24 January ==
List of shipwrecks: 24 January 1859
Ship	State	Description
Centenary	United Kingdom	The brig exploded, caught fire and sank in the North Sea off Orfordness, Suffolk. Her crew were rescued by Henry Watson (United Kingdom). Centenary was on a voyage from South Shields, County Durham to London.
Cynthia	United Kingdom	The brig was driven ashore and wrecked at Flamborough Head, Yorkshire. Her crew survived. She was on a voyage from London to Hartlepool, County Durham.
Diana	Hamburg	The ship was driven ashore at Bracklesham Bay, Sussex. United Kingdom. She was on a voyage from Hamburg to Cardiff, Glamorgan, United Kingdom. Diana was refloated on 5 May and taken in tow for Portsmouth, Hampshire, United Kingdom but consequently foundered off Southsea, Hampshire. Diana was refloated on 15 May and towed in to Southampton, Hampshire.
Louisa	United Kingdom	The ship was driven ashore at Egremont, Lancashire. She was on a voyage from Liverpool, Lancashire to Bahia, Brazil. She was refloated and towed back to Liverpool.
Providence	United Kingdom	The brigantine foundered in the Dogger Bank. Her crew were rescued by the fishing smack Secret (United Kingdom). Providence was on a voyage from Hartlepool to Great Yarmouth Norfolk.
Wansbeck	United Kingdom	The brig was driven ashore east of Wells-next-the-Sea, Norfolk. She was on a voyage from North Shields, County Durham to London. She was refloated and resumed her voyage.

== 25 January ==
List of shipwrecks: 25 January 1859
Ship	State	Description
Bell	United Kingdom	The schooner was abandoned in the North Sea 25 nautical miles (46 km) off Spurn Point, Yorkshire. Her crew were rescued by Diligence (United Kingdom).
Jupiter	(United Kingdom of Great Britain and Ireland) Jersey	The ship was driven ashore at "Newton Oyse", Pembrokeshire. She was on a voyage from Belfast, County Antrim to Great Yarmouth, Norfolk. She was later refloated.

== 26 January ==
List of shipwrecks: 26 January 1859
Ship	State	Description
Vesta	United Kingdom	The ship was wrecked at Singapore, Straits Settlements.
William Sorlie	United Kingdom	The brig was driven ashore at Borve, Barra, Outer Hebrides. Her ten crew were rescued. She was on a voyage from Glasgow, Renfrewshire to Suriname.

== 27 January ==
List of shipwrecks: 27 January 1859
Ship	State	Description
Caroline	(United Kingdom of Great Britain and Ireland) New South Wales	The ship was wrecked at Point Perpendicular. She was on a voyage from Melbourne, Victoria to Newcastle.
Malabar	United States	The ship ran aground at the mouth of the Mississippi River. She was on a voyage from New Orleans, Louisiana to Boston, Massachusetts.
Providence	United Kingdom	The barkentine sank on the Dogger Bank. Crew rescued by fishing smack "Secret" (United Kingdom).

== 28 January ==
List of shipwrecks: 28 January 1859
Ship	State	Description
Five Brothers	(United Kingdom of Great Britain and Ireland) Straits Settlements	The steamship struck an uncharted rock off "Kupchee" (or "Cupchi") Point, near "Kam-chew". She was on a voyage from Hong Kong to Swatow and Amoy, China. The wreck was fired on and attacked by local Chinese. Some 55 Chinese deck passengers who went ashore were murdered, as were two crewmen in their escape; the remaining passengers and crew were rescued by a schooner Zephyr. Gunboats were sent from Hong Kong to exact retribution.
Grace and Jane	United Kingdom	The schooner was lost near "Hangosund", Norway. Her crew were rescued by two Norwegian brigs. She was on a voyage from Gothenburg Sweden, to London.
Henry Gardner	United Kingdom	The ship was driven ashore and wrecked near Madsbøll, Denmark. Her crew were rescued. She was on a voyage from Sunderland, County Durham to Aden.
Mimi Scharitz	Bremen	The ship was wrecked on the Pickle Reef. She was on a voyage from Galveston, Texas, United States to Amsterdam, North Holland, Netherlands.
Roebuck	United States	The clipper was wrecked on Willie's Rocks, off Cohasset, Massachusetts. She was on a voyage from Boston, Massachusetts to Philadelphia, Pennsylvania.
Russell Ellice	United Kingdom	The ship was wrecked on the Hogsty Reef. She was on a voyage from Santiago de Cuba, Cuba to Swansea, Glamorgan.
Sarah Kay	United Kingdom	The barque was driven ashore near Gallipoli, Ottoman Empire. She was refloated on 31 January with the assistance of the tug Express (United Kingdom).
Swarthmore	United Kingdom	The ship was wrecked on the Gingerbread Ground, in the Bahamas. Her crew were rescued. She was on a voyage from Philadelphia, Pennsylvania to New Orleans, Louisiana, United States.

== 29 January ==
List of shipwrecks: 29 January 1859
Ship	State	Description
Gleaner	United Kingdom	The paddle tug suffere a boiler explosion, drove ashore and was wrecked at Blyth, Northumberland. Her crew were rescued by a coble. She was on a voyage from Cambois, Northumberland to Sunderland, County Durham.
Henry Gardiner	United Kingdom	The ship was wrecked at Thisted, Denmark. Her crew were rescued. She was on a voyage from Sunderland to Odesa.
Hillman	United Kingdom	The ship ran aground in the Thanlwin.
Mountstewart Elphinstone	United Kingdom	The ship was beached at Moulmein, Burma and severely damaged. She was on a voyage from Moulmein to Calcutta, India.
Sir Colin Campbell	United Kingdom	The brig ran aground on the Whittaker Spit, in the North Sea off the coast of Essex. She was on a voyage from Hartlepool, County Durham to London. She was refloated with the assistance of a smack and resumed her voyage.
Victor	(United Kingdom of Great Britain and Ireland) British North America	The brig was driven ashore and damaged at Ardrossan, Ayrshire.

== 30 January ==
List of shipwrecks: 30 January 1859
Ship	State	Description
Frances Ann	United Kingdom	The ship ran aground on the Middle Heaps, in the North Sea off the coast of Essex. She was on a voyage from London to West Hartlepool, County Durham. She was refloated and put in to Lowestoft, Suffolk in a leaky condition.
Hector	United Kingdom	The ship ran aground on The Knowle, in the North Sea off the coast of Suffolk. She was on a voyage from Newcastle upon Tyne, Northumberland to Poole, Dorset. She was refloated and assisted in to Lowestoft in a leaky condition.
Kate	United Kingdom	The ship ran aground on the Holm Sand, in the North Sea off the coast of Suffolk. She was on a voyage from Sunderland, County Durham to London. She was refloated and taken in to Lowestoft in a leaky condition.
Pioneer	United Kingdom	The ship was driven ashore and severely damaged at Buckie, Banffshire. Her two crew were rescued by the Coast Guard using rocket apparatus. She was refloated and taken in to Buckie for repairs.
Sully	France	The ship was wrecked at Rotterdam, South Holland, Netherlands. She was on a voyage from Bordeaux, Gironde to Rotterdam.
Tropic	United States	The ship was driven ashore in the Mississippi River downstream of New Orleans, Louisiana. She was on a voyage from New York to New Orleans.

== 31 January ==
List of shipwrecks: 31 January 1859
Ship	State	Description
Earl of South Esk	United Kingdom	The barque ran aground on the Shipwash Sand, in the North Sea off the coast of Suffolk. She was on a voyage from Sunderland, County Durham to Shanghai, China. She was refloated and towed in to London for repairs.

== Unknown date ==
List of shipwrecks: Unknown date January 1859
Ship	State	Description
Adele	France	The ship was driven ashore and wrecked at Tunis, Beylik of Tunis before 11 January. Her crew were rescued.
Agnes Taylor	United Kingdom	The ship ran aground at Demerara, British Guiana. She was on a voyage from Demerara to Greenock, Renfrewshire. She was refloated and put back to Demerara, where she sank.
Alma	United Kingdom	The ship ran aground in the Hooghly River at "Fort Gloster". She was refloated.
Amphitrite	United Kingdom	The brig ran aground in the River Tyne. She was refloated and resumed her voyage.
Amphore	France	The ship was driven ashore and wrecked at Tunis before 11 January. Her crew were rescued.
Ann Lee	United Kingdom	The ship ran aground in the Hooghly River. She was on a voyage from Moulmein, Burma to Calcutta, India. She was refloated and completed her voyage.
Black Prince	United Kingdom	The ship wrecked on the Holm Sand, in the North Sea off the coast of Suffolk. Her crew were rescued.
Corremuize	Netherlands	The ship ran aground on the Maneater Reef. She was on a voyage from Liverpool to Batavia, Netherlands East Indies. She was refloated with assistance from the steamship HNLMS Ardjoeno (Royal Netherlands Navy) and completed her voyage, arriving at Jakarta on 21 January.
Dutchman	Russia	The steamship was driven ashore and wrecked near Gallipoli, Ottoman Empire before 19 January with the loss of six of her crew.
Fox	United Kingdom	The ship caught fire and was beached at Bahia Formosa, Brazil before 14 January. She was on a voyage from Liverpool, Lancashire to Pernambuco, Brazil.
Gatigni	France	The barque was in collision with another vessel and was consequently abandoned. Her eight crew were rescued by the barque Saranac (United States).
Glentilt	United Kingdom	The ship caught fire in the Atlantic Ocean 25 nautical miles (46 km) off the Rio Grande before 16 January. She was on a voyage from Cardiff, Glamorgan to the River Plate. She put in to the Rio Grande, where she sank.
Goliath	United Kingdom	The ship was destroyed by fire in West Bay.
Henrietta	United States	The fishing schooner was lost on Miquelon Island. Crew saved.
Herald	United Kingdom	The brig was wrecked on the Nantucket Shoals, in the Atlantic Ocean off the coast of Massachusetts, United States.
Island Prince, or Island Queen	United Kingdom	The ship wrecked near Hodeida, Yemen Eyalet before 3 January.
James Paton	United Kingdom	The ship was driven ashore at Manasquan, New Jersey, United States. She was on a voyage from Penang, Malaya to New York, United States. She was refloated on 17 January and towed in to New York.
Jeune Adeline	France	The lugger was run down and sunk in the Bristol Channel by a British brigantine. Her crew were rescued. She was on a voyage from "Bourn" to Cardiff, Glamorgan, United Kingdom.
John	United Kingdom	The ship was driven ashore at Bridlington, Yorkshire. She was on a voyage from South Shields, County Durham to London. She was refloated on 1 February and resumed her voyage in a leaky condition.
John Franklin	United States	The schooner was lost returning from Prince Edward Island in December, 1858 or January, 1859. All aboard, 8 passengers and 7 crew, were killed.
Lamb	United Kingdom	The schooner departed from Sunderland, County Durham for Leith, Lothian in late January. No further trace, presumed foundered with the loss of all four crew.
Macassar	Belgium	The full-rigged ship was wrecked on the Bril Reef before 21 January. She was on a voyage from a port in China to Java, Netherlands East Indies.
Marie Eugenie	Austrian Empire	The ship was wrecked at "Cefontane", Sicily. She was on a voyage from Odesa, to Bremen.
Matthew King	United Kingdom	The brigantine foundered in the Irish Sea with the loss of all hands. She was on a voyage from Wilmington, Delaware, United States to Liverpool.
Monarch	United Kingdom	The brig was driven ashore on the French coast. She was on a voyage from Ostend, West Flanders, Belgium to Warkworth, Northumberland. She was refloated and subsequently put in to North Shields, County Durhf for repairs.
Naparina	United Kingdom	The barque was abandoned in the Atlantic Ocean (38°17′N 30°09′W and sank before 23 January. Her crew were rescued by the barque Giulia ( Kingdom of Sardinia). Naparina was on a voyage from "Patook", British Honduras to Queenstown, County Cork.
Norfolk	United Kingdom	The barque was abandoned in the Atlantic Ocean off the Azores before 4 December.
Olivier	France	The ship was driven ashore and wrecked at Tunis before 11 January. Her crew were rescued.
Ottalia	United Kingdom	The ship was lost in the Sittaung River.
Oxnard	United States	The full-rigged ship was abandoned off Cape Horn, Chile. Her crew were rescued by Chariot of Fame (United States). Oxnard was on a voyage from Cardiff to San Francisco, California.
Parmonia	Austrian Empire	The ship was driven ashore and wrecked near Tunis before 15 January. She was on a voyage from Alexandria, Egypt to Liverpool.
Pomona	United Kingdom	The brig foundered at Odesa.
Renang	United Kingdom	The barque was abandoned before 24 January and sank. Her crew were rescued. She was on a voyage from British Honduras to Queenstown.
Sarah	United Kingdom	The ship ran aground in the River Tyne at Pelaw, Northumberland. She was on a voyage from the River Tyne to Venice, Kingdom of Lombardy–Venetia. She was refloated and taken in to North Shields for repairs.
Seraphine	France	The ship was driven ashore and wrecked at Tunis before 11 January. Her crew were rescued.
Shanghai	United Kingdom	The full-rigged ship was wrecked at Mauritius. She was on a voyage from Liverpool to the Swan River, Western Australia.
South Carolina	United States	The ship was driven ashore and wrecked at Mobile Point, Alabama with the loss of two of her crew. She was on a voyage from Cherbourg, Seine-Inférieure, France to Mobile, Alabama.
Windau	Russia	The ship was driven ashore before 5 January. She was on a voyage from Riga to Antwerp, Belgium. She was refloated and taken in to Helsingør, Denmark in a leaky condition.
Zenobia	United Kingdom	The brig foundered in the Atlantic Ocean before 14 January. Her crew were rescued by St. Vincent de Paul (France). Zenobia was on a voyage from Cardiff, Glamorgan to a Brazilian port.
Zingari	United Kingdom	The steamship was driven ashore near Hellevoetsluis, Zeeland, Netherlands before 20 January. She was refloated.
