= Caerthillian to Kennack =

Coastal Site of Special Scientific Interest in Cornwall, England

- Site of Special Scientific Interest
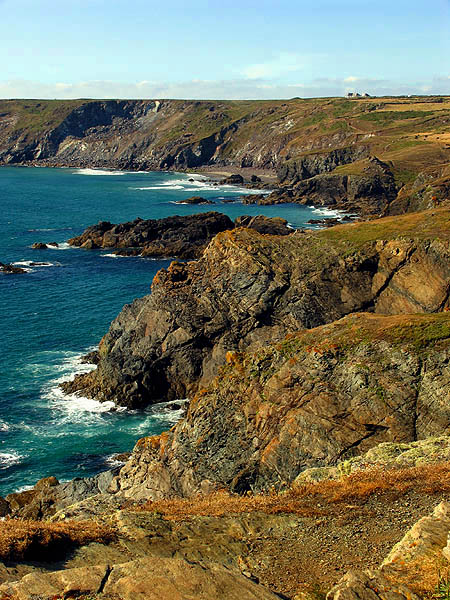
- Cliffs on the western side of the SSSI

- Location within Southwest Cornwall
- Location of Caerthillian to Kennack.
- Area of search: Cornwall
- Grid reference: SW720140
- Coordinates: 49.9829°N 5.1809°W
- Interest: Biological/Geological
- Area: 141.1 hectares (1.411 km^{2}; 0.5448 sq mi)
- Notification date: 1951

Caerthillian to Kennack is a coastal Site of Special Scientific Interest (SSSI) on the Lizard Peninsula in Cornwall, UK, noted for both its biological and geological characteristics. It is of great botanical importance, with several Red Data Book of rare and endangered plant species being found on the site, as well as a breeding site for Cornish choughs.

== Geography ==
The 141-hectare (350-acre) site straddles the south coast of the Lizard Peninsula, covering the most southerly point of the British mainland, from Caerthillian Cove in the west to Kennack Sands in the east, within the civil parishes of Grade–Ruan and Landewednack.

The South West Coast Path runs through the SSSI and most of the coastline is owned by the National Trust. The site falls partly within the Lizard national nature reserve and contains two Geological Conservation Review locations.

== History ==
The SSSI, first notified in 1951, was previously known as South and East Lizard SSSI. It was renamed after boundary expansions and deletions.

The rocks off the coast are a notorious hazard to shipping and have led to numerous shipwrecks. The Lizard Lifeboat Station is located within the SSSI.

== Geology ==
The area's bedrock is part of the Lizard complex, an ophiolite complex, and includes micaceous and hornblende schist that is overlain by serpentinized peridotite and gabbro with intrusions of granite gneiss.

== Wildlife and ecology ==
=== Flora ===
The site hosts an unusual assemblage of vegetation types and a large number of rare plant species due to the combination of a mild, moist climate that results from its proximity to the ocean; geologic conditions, including serpentine-derived soils which can constrain plant growth; and wind exposure. Botanists have suggested that the site's climate is a more important contributor to its floral diversity than its geology.

A variety of habitats exist within the site. To the south-west of the SSSI a number of maritime cliff communities exist which support vegetation such as sea aster, rock samphire (Crithmum maritimum) and sea thrift with red fescue, sea carrot (Daucus carota), Yorkshire fog, cock's-foot (Dactylis glomerata) and the nationally rare Scilla autumnalis being found further up the cliff profile.

The eastern side of the site is protected from the prevailing westerly winds on the Atlantic meaning that less hardy plants are able to grow in areas of cliff scrub. Species include blackthorn (Prunus spinosa) common gorse (Ulex europaeus), wild privet (Ligustrum vulgare) as well as more woodland plants of common dog-violet (Viola riviniana), common honeysuckle (Lonicera periclymenum), hart's-tongue (Phyllitis scolopendrium) and red campion (Silene dioica).

Three plants that are designated as nationally scarce, galingale (Cyperus longus), yellow-vetch (Vicia lutea) and bird’s-foot clover (Trifolium ornithopodioides a variety of Trifolium repens), can be found in a disused serpentinite quarry at Church Cove.

The only cliff woodland of the Lizard Peninsula is in the locality of the Devil’s Frying Pan, an old collapsed sea cave. This woodland contains Cornish elm, Dutch elm and an intermediate variety of elm. Other woodland areas occur around the windswept peninsula at Poltesco.

Red Data Book of rare and endangered plant species within the site include Cornish heath (Erica vagans), early meadow-grass (Poa infirma), fringed rupturewort (Herniaria ciliolata), long-headed clover (a subspecies of Trifolium incarnatum) and wild asparagus (a subspecies of Asparagus officinalis). There are only two populations of four-leaved allseed (Polycarpon tetraphyllum) to be found within mainland Great Britain, one of which exists at this SSSI.

=== Fauna ===
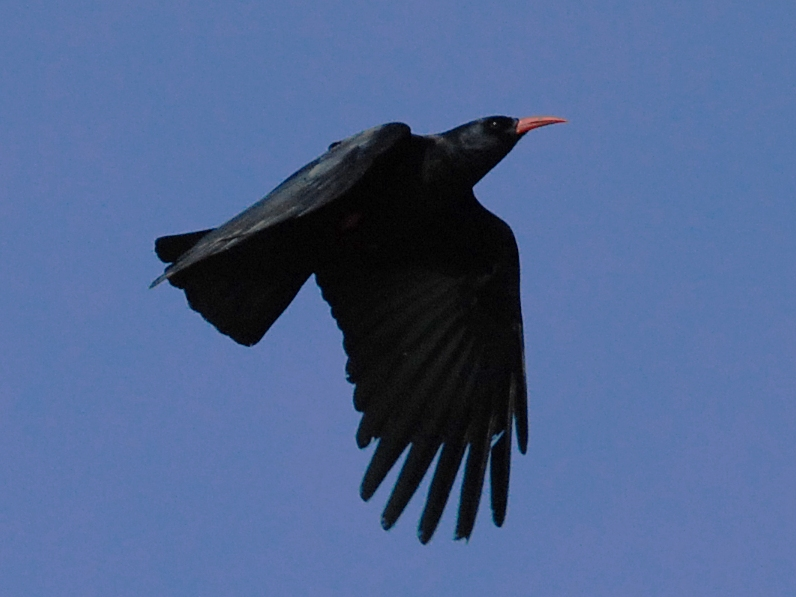
The Cornish chough, a bird that breeds on the cliffs of the SSSI

A breeding pair of Cornish choughs (Pyrrhocorax pyrrhocorax), a rare crow–like bird in Cornwall, have produced clutches of eggs in a cave at Lizard Point, within the site. In 2002 this pair was the first choughs to breed in the county in 50 years, with other pairs around Cornwall having bred since.
