= Bass Point (England) =

Headland on the coast of Cornwall, England

Coordinates: 49°57′48″N 5°11′12″W

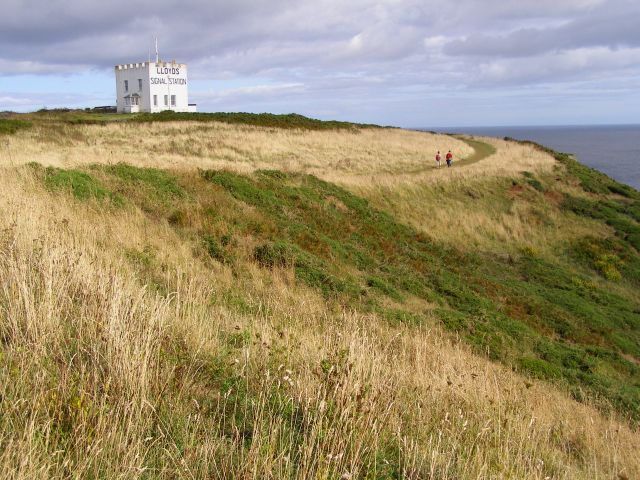
Bass Point and Lloyds Signal Station

Bass Point is a headland on the coast of Cornwall, England. It is at the southern tip of the Lizard peninsula, in the civil parish of Landewednack. The headland was a communications centre during the Victorian era, with the Lloyds Signal Station, opened in 1872 for shore to ship communications, and Marconi's experiments with wireless at the Lizard Wireless Station.

== Geography ==
The National Trust owned headland is 1 mile (1.6 km) to the east of the Lizard Point, the most southerly point on mainland Great Britain. Between the two headlands is the Lizard Lighthouse and Housel Cove and less than a mile to the north is Church Cove. Bass Point can be reached via the A3083 from Helston to Lizard village and then walking along Lloyds Road to the coast. The South-west coastal footpath crosses the headland, which is part of the Cornwall Area of Outstanding Natural Beauty.

== History ==
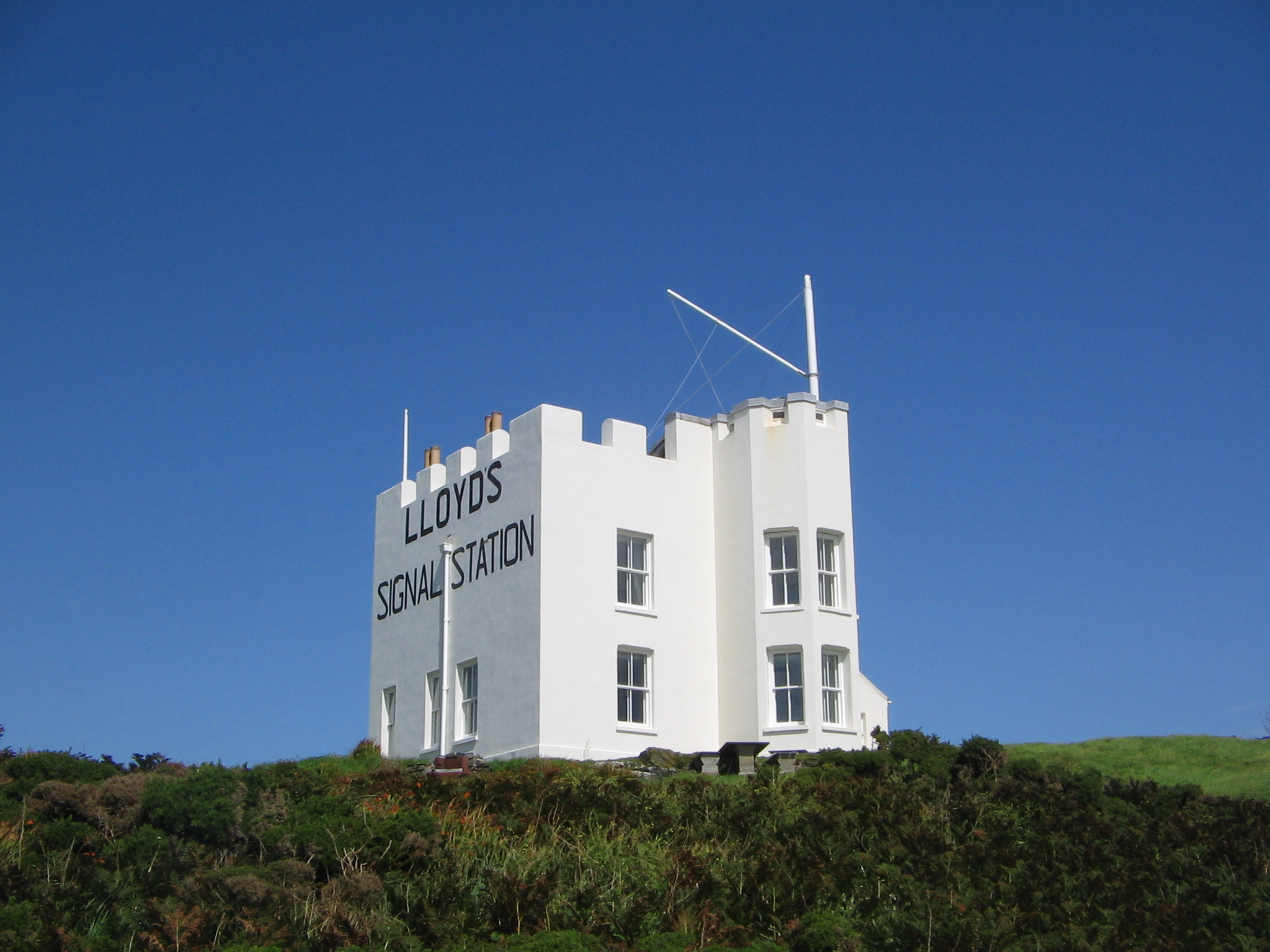
Lloyds Signal Station

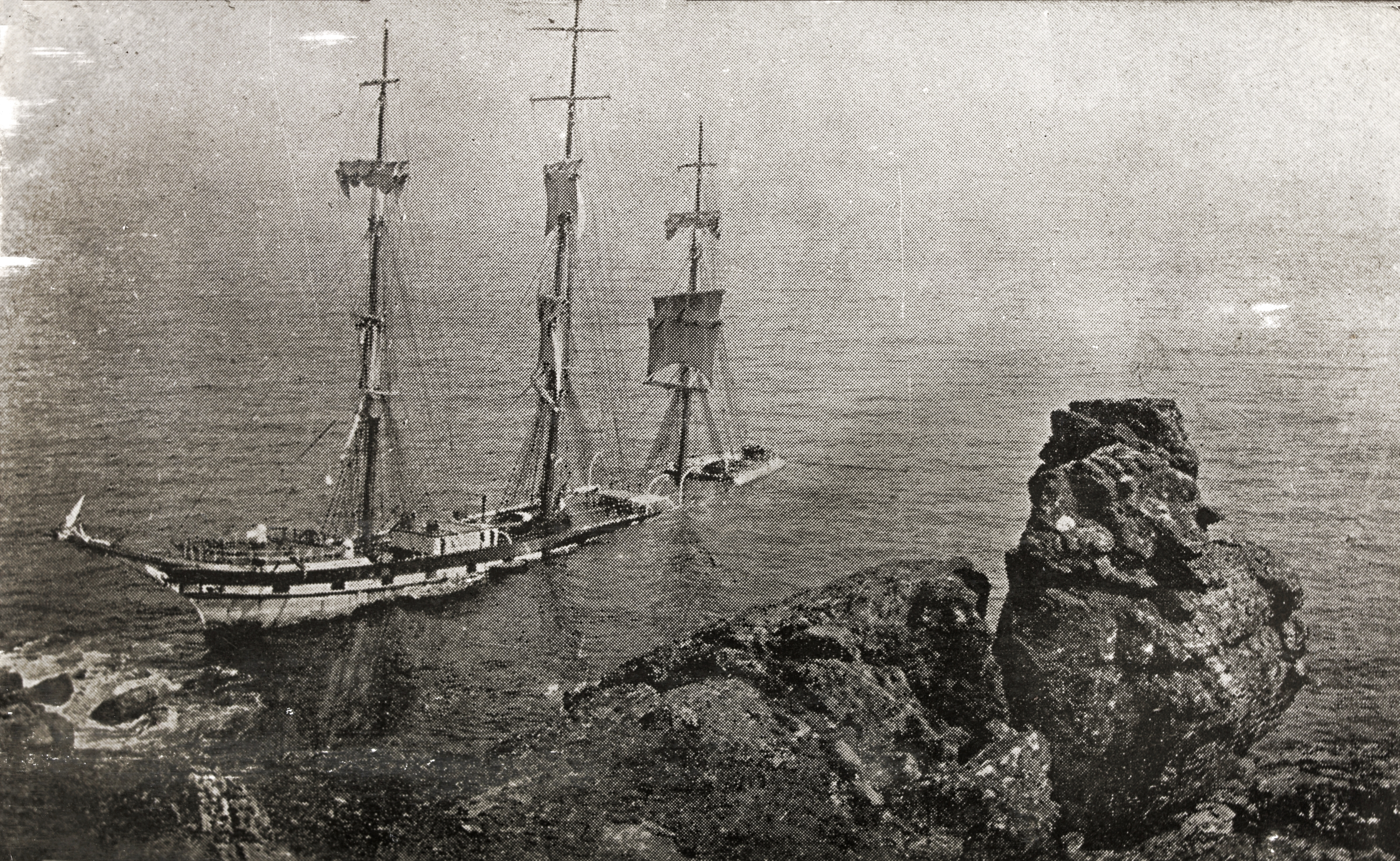
The wreck of the Cromdale 1913 at Bass Point

Before the advent of the telegraph, ships had no means of communication with their owners and could only send messages by semaphore when they were close to the shore. The telegraph reached Falmouth in 1857 and G. C. Fox & Company built a signal station at Bass Point with the intention of laying a telegraph cable from Falmouth. The Post Office intervened and the Lloyds Signal Station was opened on 1 April 1872. Initially communications between ship and shore were by flags and the messages were then sent to Helston by post or by horse rider. On 2 June 1872 a cable reached the signal station and the Post Office opened an office at the station. Night signals by coloured lights, gun, rocket and steam whistles began in November 1872 and William Broad & Sons of Falmouth opened an office next door. The companies combined their operations in 1875 and by 1877 over one hundred vessels a month were using the station. It has been restored to recreate the original radio room and may be visited.

The former HM Coastguard station at Bass Point was the first location refurbished by the National Coastwatch Institution in 1994, following the deaths of two local fishermen close to the point.

=== Radio history ===
Marconi constructed two wireless stations on the Lizard, with the main, larger station being at Poldhu on the west coast.

On 23 January 1901 he made the first ever ′over the horizon′ radio signal to St Catherine's Point, on the Isle of Wight.

== Natural history ==
Bass Point is part of the Caerthillian to Kennack coastal Site of Special Scientific Interest (SSSI) and since August 2016 is included within The Lizard National Nature Reserve (NNR). In recent years the National Trust has removed Hottentot fig (Carpobrotus edulis), an introduced plant, which forms mats covering the coastal grassland.
