= Poltesco =

Hamlet and valley in Cornwall

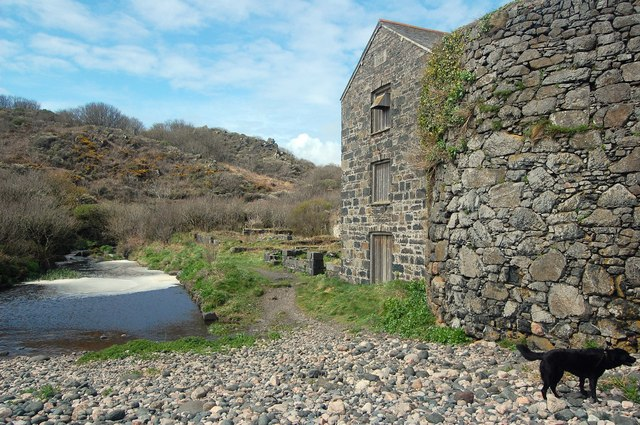
- Poltesco serpentine works, Cornwall

- Location within Cornwall

Geography
- Location: two miles north-east of Lizard Point on the eastern side of the Lizard peninsula
- Country: England
- State: Cornwall
- Region: South West England
- District: The Lizard
- Coordinates: 49°59′51″N 5°10′40″W
- Interactive map of Poltesco
- Map Ref: SW7216

Poltesco is a hamlet and valley in the parish of Grade-Ruan, on the Lizard Peninsula, Cornwall, UK. The lower part of the valley is owned by the National Trust and was once the site of a stone industry that exported carved ornaments to the rest of Britain and Europe.

== Geography ==
The Poltesco stream drains the southern part of Goonhilly Downs and reaches the sea at Carleon Cove on the east coast of the Lizard. At the head of a small tributary, on the downs, are the remains of South Wheal Treasure copper mine, working in 1823. The walls of three or four large buildings, including an engine house, can still be seen. A lode has not been located.

The stream flows through a wooded valley and discharges at Carleon Cove on the east side of the Lizard Peninsula. Less than 1 km to the north-east is the beach at Kennack Sands and 1 km to the south-west the village of Cadgwith. The South West Coast Path, which follows the coast of south-west England from Somerset to Dorset, crosses the Poltesco stream at Carleon Cove. The valley forms part of the Cornwall Area of Outstanding Natural Beauty and is within the Caerthillian to Kennack Site of Special Scientific Interest (SSSI). The tree and shrub cover makes Poltesco an unusual feature of the windswept peninsula.

The stream is the southernmost flowing waterway in mainland Britain.

== History ==
From the early 14th century to the late part of the 19th century, there was an important fishery operating out of Carleon Cove which included a pilchard fishery documented from the early part of the 18th century to the early part of the 19th century. Many of the buildings were reused by the late 19th-century serpentine factory. The only visible evidence of the fishing industry is the round, roofless building in the cove, housing the capstan which was used to haul boats out of the water.

A water mill and mill pool (grid reference SW723157) still survive on the southern side of the valley, built mostly in the 18th and 19th centuries and possibly dating back to the 14th century. There is a crucifixion figure carved inside the building which may be medieval. The waterwheel dates from the 1870s.

=== Lizard Serpentine Company ===
The first written evidence of worked serpentine is from 1828, when a Mr Drew of Penzance, who was repairing the Lizard Lighthouse, carved serpentine in his spare time. It is likely that he learnt it from a long-established local tradition. Serpentine had been used locally for dwellings, farm buildings, stiles, etc., and to build several church towers such as at Mullion and Landewednack. A tour of the Penzance serpentine works, in 1846, by Prince Albert and the royal family, resulted in an order for mantelpieces and pedestals for Osborne House on the Isle of Wight. Interest in serpentine products continued to increase following The Great Exhibition of 1851, which was visited by six million people and showcased products from all of the world. The Lizard Serpentine Company built a factory at Poltesco in 1855 and later increased the buildings to include a showroom, warehouse and offices. The walls were of snecked serpentine blocks, and the roof had clay ridge tiles and a scantle slate roof. The company had a showroom on the Strand, London, where there was a 7-foot-6-inch-tall (2.29 m) vase on display. Stone came from local quarries by cart, and the finished stoneware was ferried in flat-bottomed barges to schooners offshore. The company was wound up in 1870 and relaunched as the Poltesco Marble Company.

=== Demise of the serpentine industry ===
Notably, the Poltesco Marble Company omitted the word ′serpentine′ from its name. A water wheel, built by Mr Toy of Helston, was completed in 1881 and according to The Cornishman newspaper the large showroom was ″well worth a visit and was filled with carvings of all sorts, shapes, sizes and values″. By 1883 the factory had reduced its workforce to twenty men and three boys, and the products were smaller and less grand, although another report in The Cornishman newspaper stated that the showrooms were well worth a visit.

There were a number of factors for the demise of the industry. The serpentine rock used for carving came from small seams within a larger mineral complex, and the search for unflawed large pieces of rock exhausted the small quarries, which raised costs. Fashions changed, serpentine was no longer a novelty and its poor weathering qualities made it unsuitable for outside use. In 1893 the company was wound up due to falling demand, and the uninsured loss at sea of finished products. Machinery of value was sold off, and the buildings were abandoned, to leave walkers on the coastal footpath to view a post-industrial landscape. During the First World War, some of the buildings were requisitioned as a carpenter's workshop and children's playroom. The water wheel remained in use for chaffing until 1917, when it was removed. Between the wars the site was considered for a holiday camp, and some of the works were partially demolished in 1923 with explosives. Carleon House was leased to the manager Herbert Cohen in 1889, and his daughter bought it and lived there until 1947. The house and valley now belong to the National Trust.

Remains can still be seen on the shore of Carleon Cove along with the roofless capstan from the fishing industry.
