= Bass Point =

Bass Point can refer to:

- Bass Point (Australia), a headland on the New South Wales coast
- Bass Point (England), a headland on the Cornwall coast
