= Kuggar =

Coordinates: 50.0035035°N 5.177612°W

Kuggar: Cornish: Koger
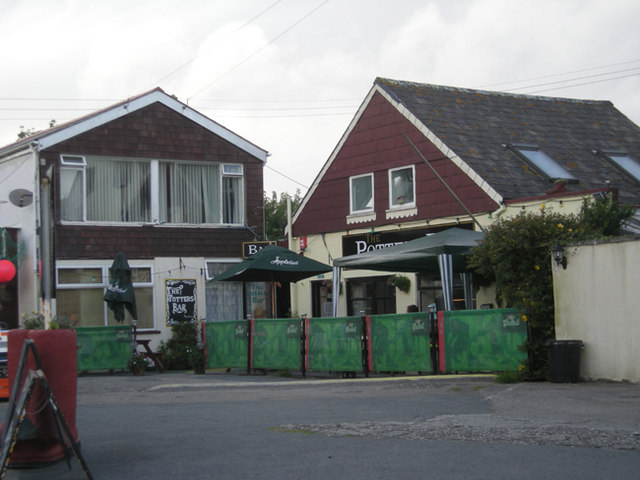
- The Potters Bar' at Kuggar

- Location within Cornwall
- Unitary authority: Cornwall
- Ceremonial county: Cornwall
- Region: South West
- Country: England
- Sovereign state: United Kingdom
- Post town: HELSTON
- Postcode district: TR12
- Police: Devon and Cornwall
- Fire: Cornwall
- Ambulance: South Western

Kuggar (Cornish: Koger) is a hamlet in the parish of Grade-Ruan in Cornwall, England. Kuggar, within the Cornwall Area of Outstanding Natural Beauty (AONB), lies off the A3083 road, between the villages of St Ruan and Gwendreath.

== Landmarks ==
The area is dominated by holiday parks, particularly the Sea Acres and Kennack Sands Holiday Parks. The main road leading through the hamlet leads north to the B3293 road, near Goonhilly Satellite Earth Station.

== Wildlife ==
Rare birds have been spotted on the Sands nearby. Kennack Sands has been described as "one of the cleanest beaches in Britain, with beautifully clear water". In 1918, Allium triquetrum was found by a stream in the vicinity. In the summer months, Basking sharks and Pinnipeds have been spotted off the coast nearby.
