= Lizard Point, Cornwall =

Southernmost point of mainland Great Britain

Coordinates: 49.9591°N 5.2065°W

Lizard Point: Cornish: Penn Lysardh
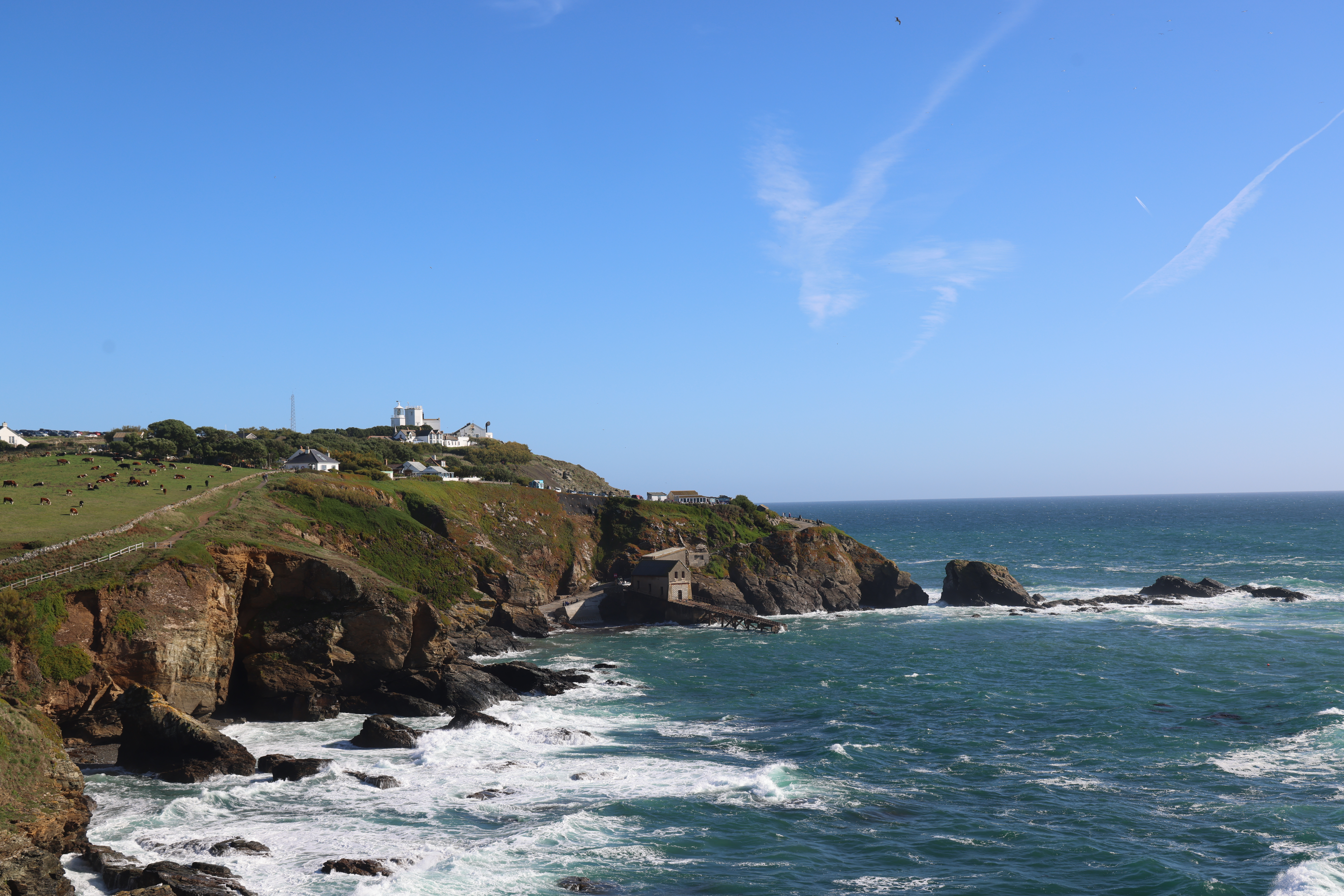
- Southernmost part of Lizard Point

- Location within Cornwall
- OS grid reference: SW695115
- Unitary authority: Cornwall
- Ceremonial county: Cornwall
- Region: South West
- Country: England
- Sovereign state: United Kingdom
- Post town: HELSTON
- Postcode district: TR12
- Police: Devon and Cornwall
- Fire: Cornwall
- Ambulance: South Western

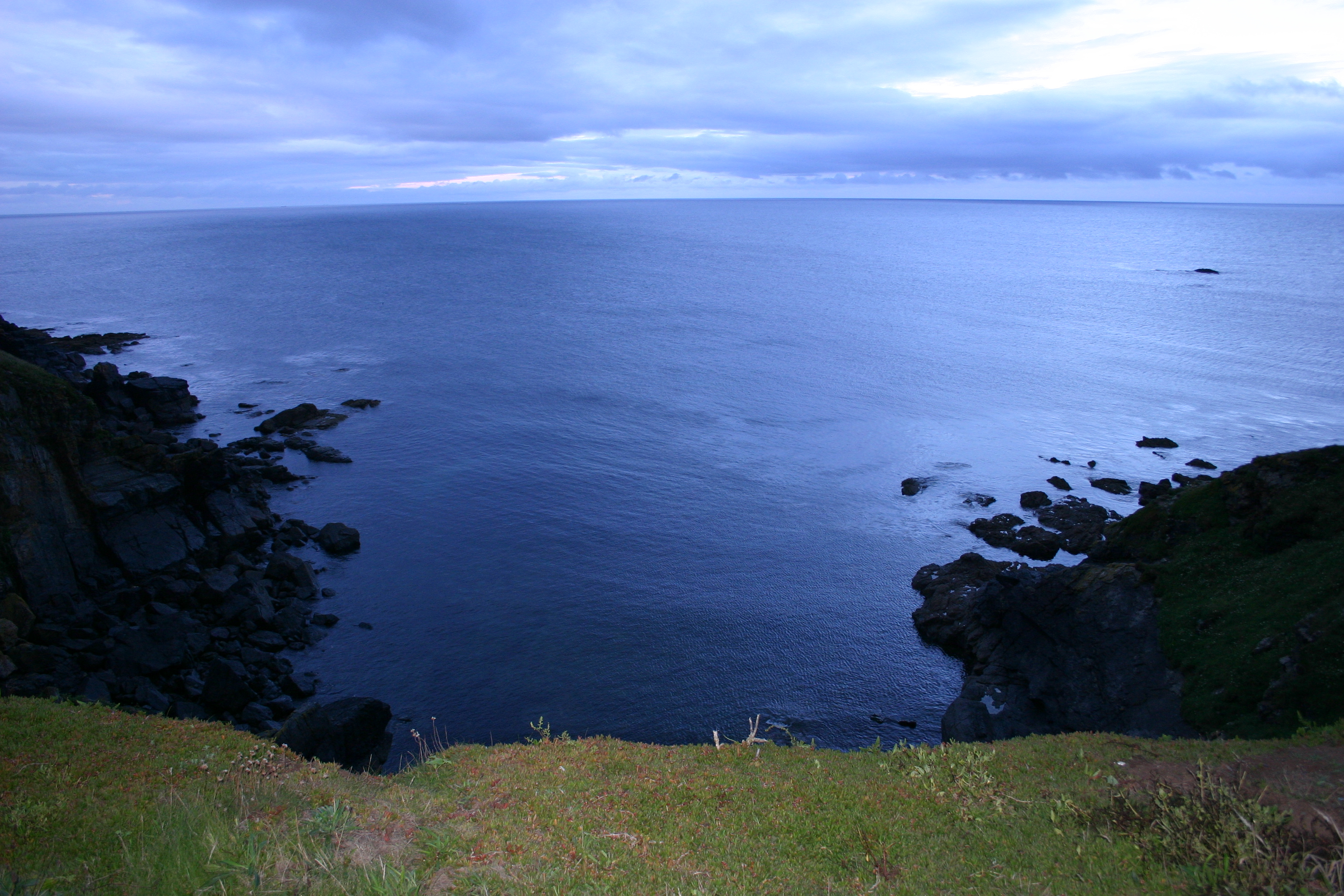
View from Lizard Point

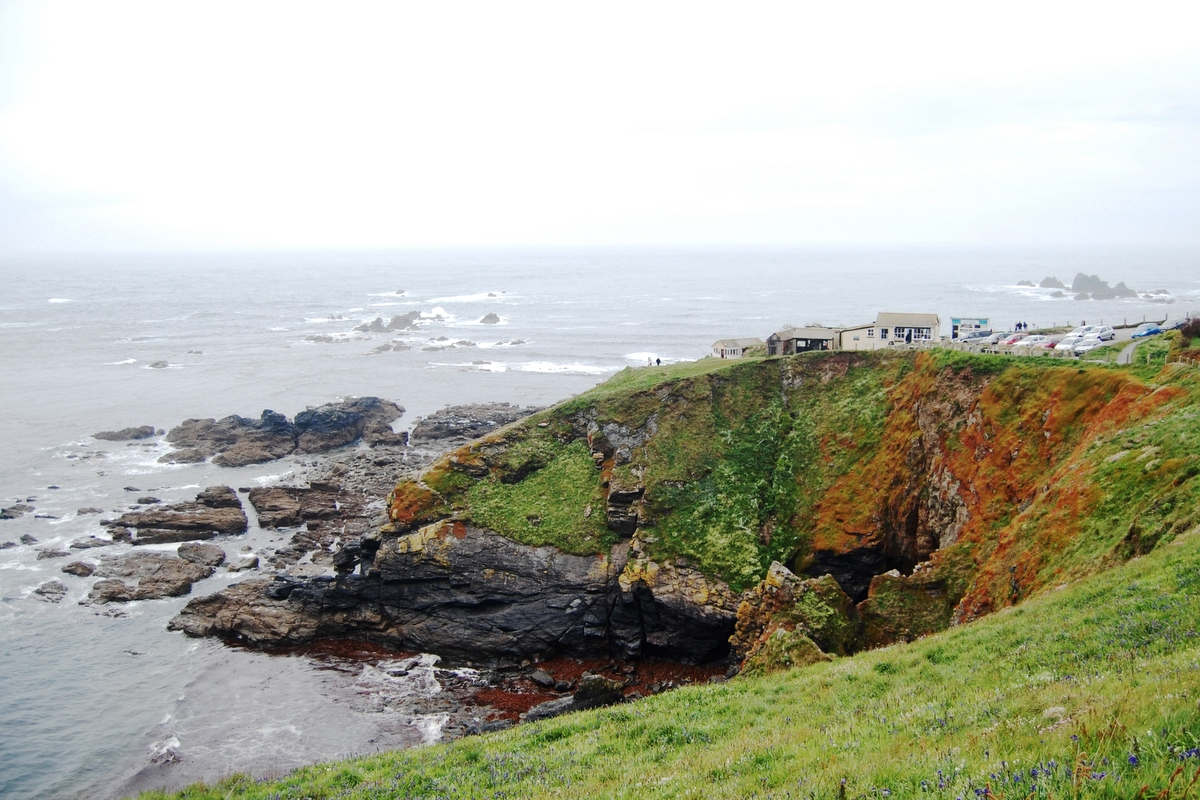
Lizard Point seen from near the Youth Hostel

Lizard Point (Cornish: Penn Lysardh) in Cornwall is at the southern tip of the Lizard Peninsula. It is situated half-a-mile (800 m) south of Lizard village in the civil parish of Landewednack and about 11 miles (18 km) southeast of Helston.

Lizard Point is the most southern point on mainland Great Britain at 49° 57' 30" N.

== History and geography ==
Lizard Point is for many ships the starting point of their ocean passage and a well known shipping hazard. The Lizard Lighthouse is situated at Lizard Point. Immediately below the lighthouse, situated in what used to be a hotel, is the YHA Lizard Youth Hostel. Lizard Point is situated within Caerthillian to Kennack SSSI (Site of Special Scientific Interest), noted for its biological and geological interest. Polpeor Cove is a small cove to the east of Lizard Point.

The area is famous for its carved serpentine items, which range from ornaments to the pump handles in the Five Pilchards public house, in Porthallow. The geology of Lizard is of particular interest, being interpreted as an ophiolite, a piece of ocean floor, with a number of planned walks available from local tourist authorities to discover more about the local rocks.

The first sighting of the Spanish Armada on mainland Britain was off Lizard Point at 3 pm on 29 July 1588.

The Battle at the Lizard, between the English and the French navies during the War of the Spanish Succession, took place off The Lizard on 21 October 1707.

=== Sinking of Ardgarry ===
The 1,074 gross ton bulk coaster carrier MV Ardgarry (1957) was lost in a heavy storm, in over 30 ft (9m) high waves, off Lizard Point on 29 December 1962. All 12 crewmen perished and were never found. She was built by James Lamont & Co at the Port Glasgow shipyard. The Ardgarry was carrying coal from Swansea and headed to Rouen in France. Six of the crew were from Northern Ireland, five from Scotland, and one from Donegal in the Republic of Ireland. Found again in 2006, the ship's bell was recovered, and a memorial service was held by family members in August 2008.

=== Bugaled Breizh sinking ===
On 15 January 2004 the French fishing trawler Bugaled Breizh (child of Brittany) sank off Lizard Point with the loss of five lives. There were claims at the time by French marine accident experts that the vessel may have been pulled under when her nets became entangled in a British or Dutch submarine which was conducting NATO exercises in the area at the time.

== Lifeboat service ==
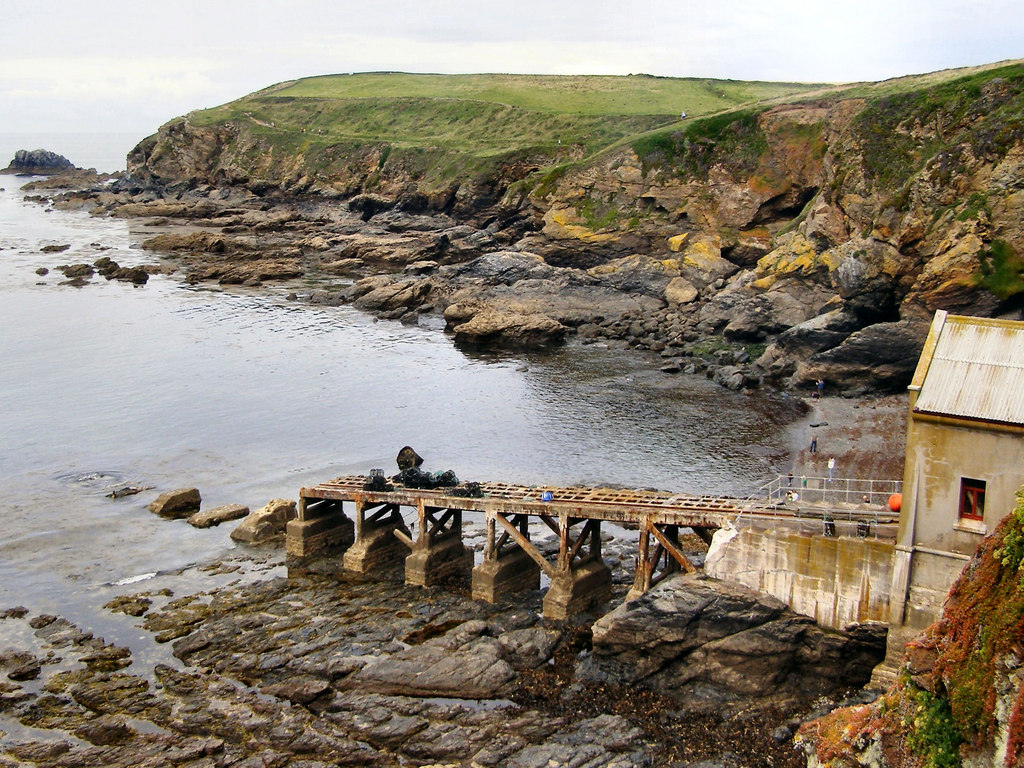
The disused lifeboat slipway, Polpeor Cove

The Royal National Lifeboat Institution (RNLI) operates The Lizard lifeboat station at Kilcobben Cove, two miles (3 km) northeast of Lizard Point. A Tyne class lifeboat is housed in a large boathouse at the base of the cliff. The station features a funicular line to transport lifeboat crews from the boathouse to the clifftop station car park.

The biggest rescue in the RNLI's history was 17 March 1907 when the 12,000 tonne liner SS Suevic hit the Maenheere Reef near Lizard Point. In a strong gale and dense fog RNLI lifeboat volunteers rescued 456 passengers, including seventy babies. Crews from The Lizard, Cadgwith, Coverack and Porthleven rowed out repeatedly for sixteen hours to rescue all of the people on board. Six silver RNLI medals were later awarded, two to Suevic crew members.

== In popular culture ==
The opening track on Brian Eno's 1982 album Ambient 4: On Land is named after Lizard Point.

== See also ==
- Land's End, westernmost point of mainland England
- Marshall Meadows Bay, northernmost point of England
- Ness Point, easternmost point of England
