= Ogo-dour Cove =

Small cove

Coordinates: 49.997°N 5.25747°W

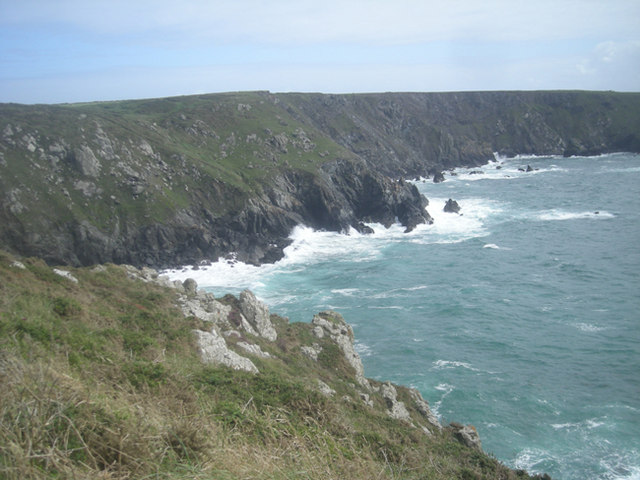
Ogo-dour Cove

Ogo-dour Cove is a small cove located at grid reference SW 667 157. Its name comes from the Cornish words 'ogo' meaning a 'cave' and 'dour' meaning 'water' its name is literally "Cave-Water Cove" in Cornish. It is at the northern end of Predannack Downs on the west side of the Lizard peninsula in Cornwall.

The cove is in a picturesque region, and is important ecologically as an area frequented by the rare Cornish chough. The Lizard complex is also of considerable geological interest as the base of an ophiolite thrust sheet. The calcium aluminosilicate mineral prehnite occurs here.
