= Wherrytown =

Settlement in Cornwall, United Kingdom

Coordinates: 50°06′40″N 5°32′28″W

Wherrytown: Cornish: Trehweri
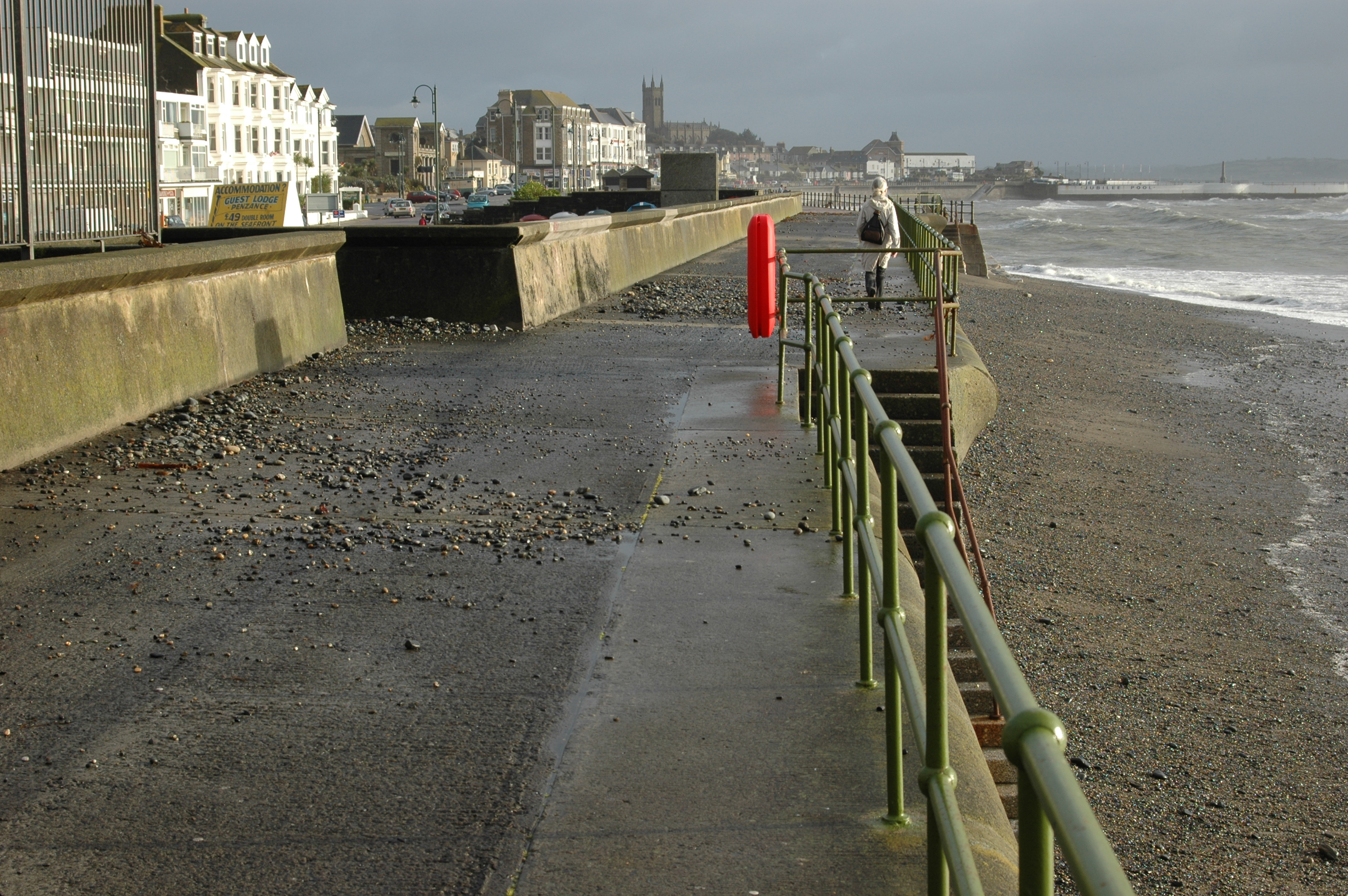
- Penzance Promenade seen from Wherrytown in 2005

- Location within Cornwall
- Unitary authority: Cornwall
- Region: South West
- Country: England
- Sovereign state: United Kingdom
- Police: Devon and Cornwall
- Fire: Cornwall
- Ambulance: South Western

Wherrytown (Cornish: Trehweri) is a small settlement in west Cornwall, United Kingdom, on the east side of the Laregan River, between Newlyn and Penzance. It was formerly in the civil parish of Madron and was incorporated into the Borough of Penzance in 1934 when local government was reorganised.

The area bore the brunt of the Ash Wednesday storm on 7 March 1962, with most of the buildings destroyed along with nearly one mile of the seafront from the Battery Rocks to Tolcarne heavily damaged. The only Wherrytown building to survive was the Mount's Bay Inn. At low spring tides, and after storms partially fossilised trees can be exposed. The South West Coast Path follows the shore.

== Submerged forest ==
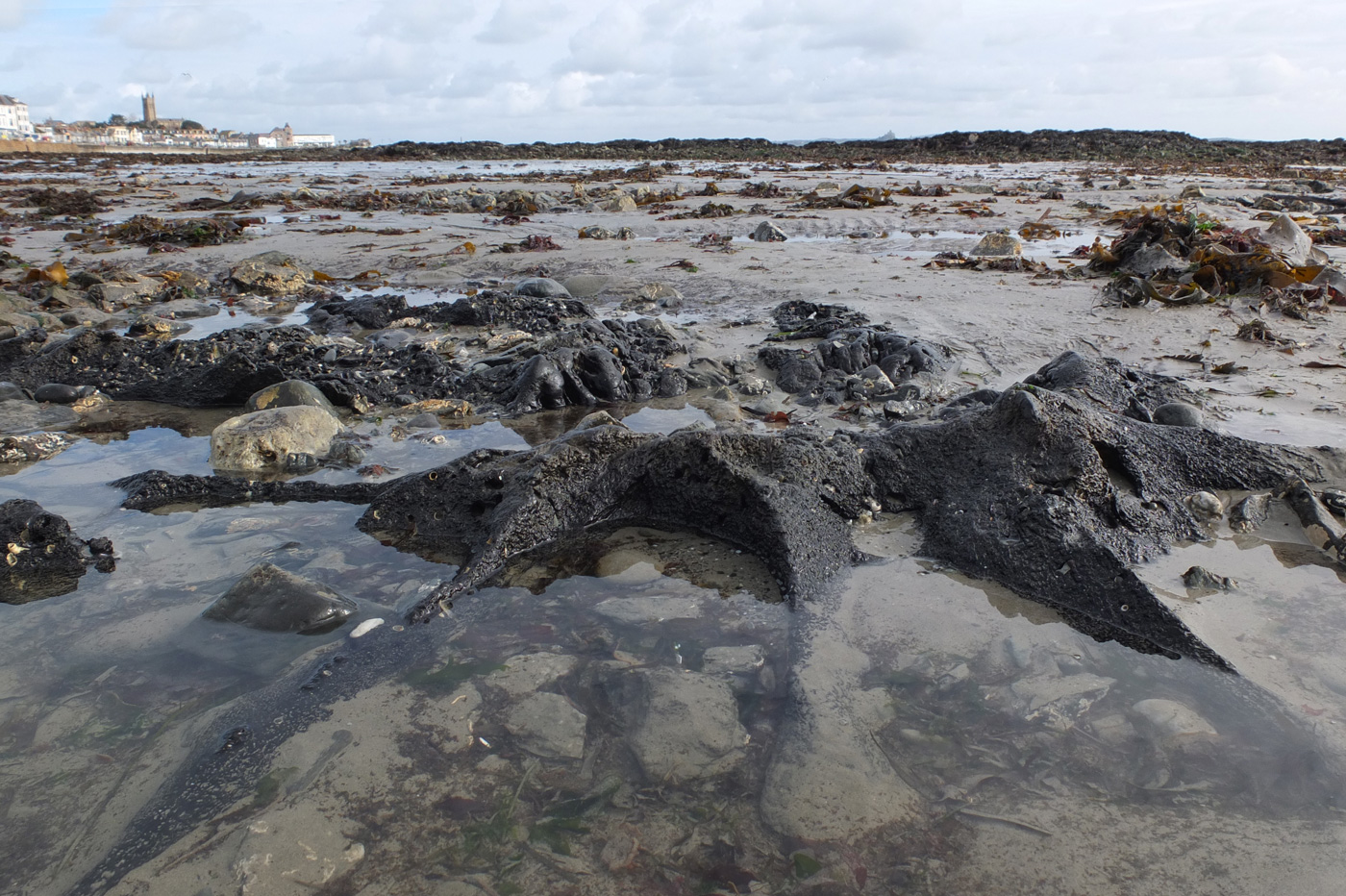
Rooted oak stump visible low tide, Spring 2015

Offshore surveys of Mount's Bay have found submerged, erosional plains and valleys containing deposits of peat, sand and gravel. The deposits indicate cyclical changes from wetland, to coastal forest, to brackish conditions have been occurring over the past 12,000 years as sea levels rose. Either side of Penzance, on the beaches at Ponsandane and Wherrytown, evidence of a ′submerged forest′ can be seen at low tide in the form of several partially fossilised tree trunks. Divers and trawlers also find submerged tree trunks across Mount’s Bay and the forest may have covered a coastal plain 2 to 5 kilometres further south than today. The samples of peat and wood around Penzance have been radiocarbon dated and indicate that the forest was growing from at least 6,000 to around 4,000 years ago when rising sea levels finally killed the trees. Artefacts dating from the Mesolithic (10,000 to 5,000 BCE) have been found indicating some occupation contemporary with the forest. Marshes formed and were overlain by sand, gravel and by sand dunes which formed natural barriers to the sea. The Western Green (a sand dune system, now under Penzance promenade) was such a barrier. Storms sometimes destroyed the barriers depositing sand and gravel over peat beds in Marazion Marsh, and in the foundations of buildings in Wherrytown. The submerged forest in the intertidal area between Wherrytown and Long Rock is of national importance and is a County Geology Site, designated by the Cornwall Geoconservation Group of Cornwall Wildlife Trust.

== History ==
The settlement is named after the wherry (Cornish: hweri), a type of rowing boat.

Before 1845, the harbour at Penzance was tidal, had only one pier and was open to easterly winds. Wherrytown was then outside the Borough of Penzance, and to avoid congestion and harbour dues, vessels grounded at the mouth of the Lariggan river to discharge their cargos into carts at low water.

=== Wheal Wherry ===
A record book from the Angarrack smelting house refers, in 1713 and 1714 to "Penzance Work" and "Wheal Kathleen", although the actual sites are not known. Joseph Hawkins, writing in 1818, states that the reef at Wherrytown had been worked for tin from around the beginning of the 18th century, although he did not give any description or further details. Daniel Defoe, staying in Penzance in circa 1722 wrote in A tour thro' the whole island of Great Britain – " .... the veins of lead, tinn, and copper ore, are said to be seen, even to the utmost extent of land at low water mark, and in the very sea .... ". In 1762 one-tenth of the Wherry bounds (the boundaries of a tin mine) formed part of the security for a mortgage to Rachel Hawkins of Penquite, Golant.

In or about 1778, Thomas Curtis of Breage sank a shaft on the rocks below the high tide mark. The shaft was protected by a stone breakwater and a wooden turret, to keep the sea out. On the death of Curtis in 1791 the mine was acquired by Thomas Gundry, along with unnamed partners, and a steam engine was built onshore to drain the mine. The operations are said to have come to a halt in 1798, when an American ship broke its moorings and drifted on to the rocks and demolishing the shafthead. An account, published in 1809 of the mine closure blames a storm, and a book published in 1820 blames high tides, storms and the ″declining state of the lode″ as the reasons why the adventurers decided to abandon the mine in 1798. Neither book blames an American ship for the closure of the mine, although the 1809 account may refer to a storm on 2 January 1796 which is said to have driven a ship out of the harbour at Penzance, and stranded her on a nearby rock. £70,000 worth of tin ore was sold in total. During a discussion at the 1881 AGM of the Royal Geological Society of Cornwall on the production of cobalt in Cornwall, Mr T S Bolitho mentioned that prior to 1816 cobalt was produced at the Wherry mine. Production stopped in 1816 following the discovery of the ore in Germany, when the price fell from £3 3s to £3.

A proposal to reopen in 1823 came to nothing and in 1836 a new company was formed building a new pier and installing a 40-inch engine onshore. At that time there were low, grass, towans and the high-water mark was seaward of the present promenade. The water around the mine was not as deep as it is now, the shore was covered in sand and gravel with the nearby Laregan rocks covered in sand and the Lariggan stream flowing to the west of the rocks. By the side of the road from Newlyn was a ropewalk. The destruction of the towans began with the laying of the foundations for the engine house, count house (offices) and smiths' shop. Operations ceased in 1840 and the engine sold at auction. The stone from the engine house, chimney stack and walls was used to build houses in what became the village of Wherrytown.

A storm on 12 February 1883 changed the course of the Lariggan stream to the east of the reef and caused erosion to the sea wall, which was blamed on ″the continual removal of sand for agricultural purposes″. By 1905 much of the sand and gravel had been quarried for farming and building, lowering the beach.

The last attempt at opening the mine was in 1967, when a temporary quay was built to the end of the nearby Laregan rocks.

=== Serpentine works ===
The derelict site of the Wherry mine was bought by three Penzance businessmen; John Bromley, Richard Millet and John Organ, and a large building erected. Serpentine was brought from the Lizard, across Mount's Bay to Penzance, and the finished goods were shipped out of Penzance harbour. A tour of the works, in 1846, by Prince Albert and the royal family, resulted in an order for mantelpieces and pedestals for Osborne House on the Isle of Wight. By 1848 the company employed thirty-seven men.

The Great Exhibition of 1851 showcased products from all of the world and was visited by six million people. John Organ was one of the prize winners; for a pair of 13 ft (4.0 m) serpentine obelisks which were replicas of Cleopatra's Needle, and a carved font which was later exhibited in New York. A large Bacchanalian vase hand-carved by Arthur Harvey of Penzance was also exhibited. The exhibition brought serpentine to the attention of the British public and orders increased. Products included columns, fireplaces, obelisks, pedestals, pilasters and urns and customers included the Duke of Devonshire, the Earl of Darnley, the Marquis of Westminster and further items for the Royal Family. Chatsworth House. Hampton Court and Westminster Abbey were all destinations for objects, as well as numerous private and public buildings. The increase in demand and subsequent increases in administration and marketing necessitated the opening of offices. A partnership was formed in 1851 with a group of London businessmen to form the London and Penzance Serpentine Company, with offices at 5 Waterloo Place, Pall Mall. The following year John Organ was the general manager of the company when the London partners bought control.

In the International Exhibition in London in 1862 items were again shown, but there was now competition from the Lizard Serpentine Company based at Poltesco, and from Mr Pearce's workshop in Truro. At the height of the stone’s popularity there were at least eleven working quarries on the Lizard and Poltesco was soon to gain commercial superiority. As the company at Poltesco expanded, production at Wherrytown declined and the London and Penzance Serpentine Company closed in 1865.

In 1878 Col Heberden RA, IAAF inspected the 10th Battery of the DCAV (Duke of Cornwall Artillery Volunteers) in the Drill Hall, Wherrytown. After the closure the site was still referred to as the serpentine works and was damaged by a storm on 7 October 1880 and again in February 1883, when the armoury was flooded. It was finally demolished in 1916.

In 1883 Messrs Freeman and Sons employed nineteen men at the Wherrytown yard, who cut stones from their three granite quarries at Lamorna, New Mill and Sheffield. At that time the yard was shaping stones for the new harbour at Penzance.

=== Lifeboat station ===
The first lifeboat in Cornwall was stationed at Penzance harbour in 1803, and in 1862 there was local controversy when, on several occasions, the boat did not launch. Proposals to move the lifeboat to Newlyn would have been unpopular with the residents of Penzance and as a compromise the lifeboat station moved to Wherrytown (which was at that time in the Parish of Madron). A new timber lifeboat house was opened in 1867 at the bottom of Alexandra Road, near the Coastguard Station and the lifeboat was stationed there until 1885, when the lifeboat returned to Penzance.

=== Other buildings ===
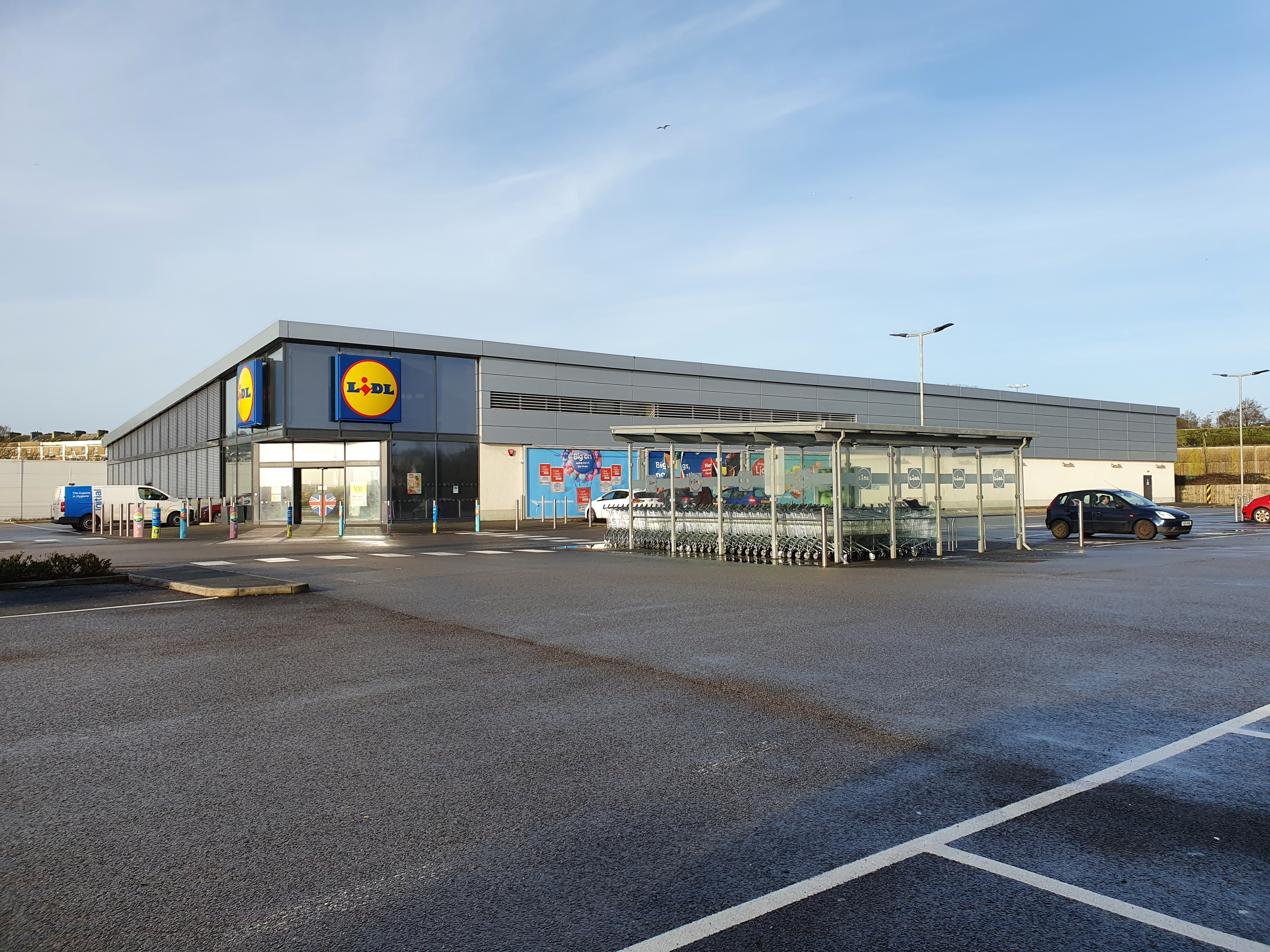
Lidl supermarket at its new site in 2021

In or about 1871 Messrs Coulsons set up a timber yard and by 1883 was employing nine people. The mill contained a thirteen horse-power steam engine which ran a vertical saw-frame and a circular bench. The saw-frame could run up to 27 saws at a time.

Bodilly & Co built a large flour mill near to the site of the Wheal Wherry Mine engine house in 1874. On 7 October 1880 the seawall protecting the drill hall, granary and a smith was levelled by the sea for more than 50 feet (15 m) and all three buildings and dwellings flooded. The road to Newlyn was swept away. In 1883 Bodilly's was the smaller of the three flour mills in or near Penzance with an average of 600 sacks per week and 800 when working at full capacity. The other mills were Branwell's next to the railway station and Bazeley's at Gulval. The mill was disused by 1906 and in 1920 demolished. The site was taken over and used as a bus depot by Western National and in the 21st century a Lidl supermarket. The supermarket moved to a nearby site in 2017.

== Popular culture ==
The Wherry Mine is described in R.M. Ballantyne's Deep Down.

== See also ==
- Ash Wednesday Storm of 1962
