= Battery Rocks =

Coordinates: 50.11455°N 5.53047°W

Battery Rocks: Cornish: Kerrek Gonnva
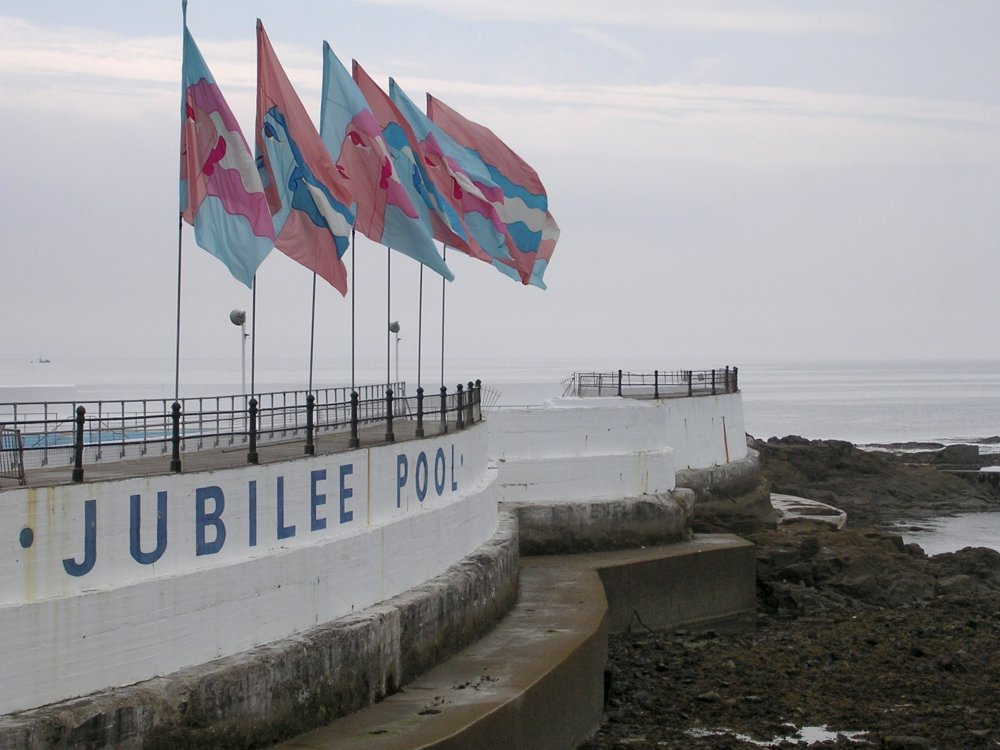
- Jubilee Pool on Battery Rocks

- Location within Cornwall
- OS grid reference: SW477298
- Unitary authority: Cornwall
- Ceremonial county: Cornwall
- Region: South West
- Country: England
- Sovereign state: United Kingdom
- Postcode district: TR18
- Police: Devon and Cornwall
- Fire: Cornwall
- Ambulance: South Western

Battery Rocks (Cornish: Kerrek Gonnva) are a rocky headland to the south of the harbour of Penzance, Cornwall, England.

The rocks take their name from a gun battery that was situated there from 1740, following a petition by Penzance Borough council for protection from French naval attacks. The rocks are the setting for the Penzance war memorial, which is built on the battery, and the restored Grade II Listed Jubilee Pool, an art deco lido, one of the very few surviving and described in the listing notes as one of the finest examples. People swim from the rocks daily throughout the year.

== Geography ==
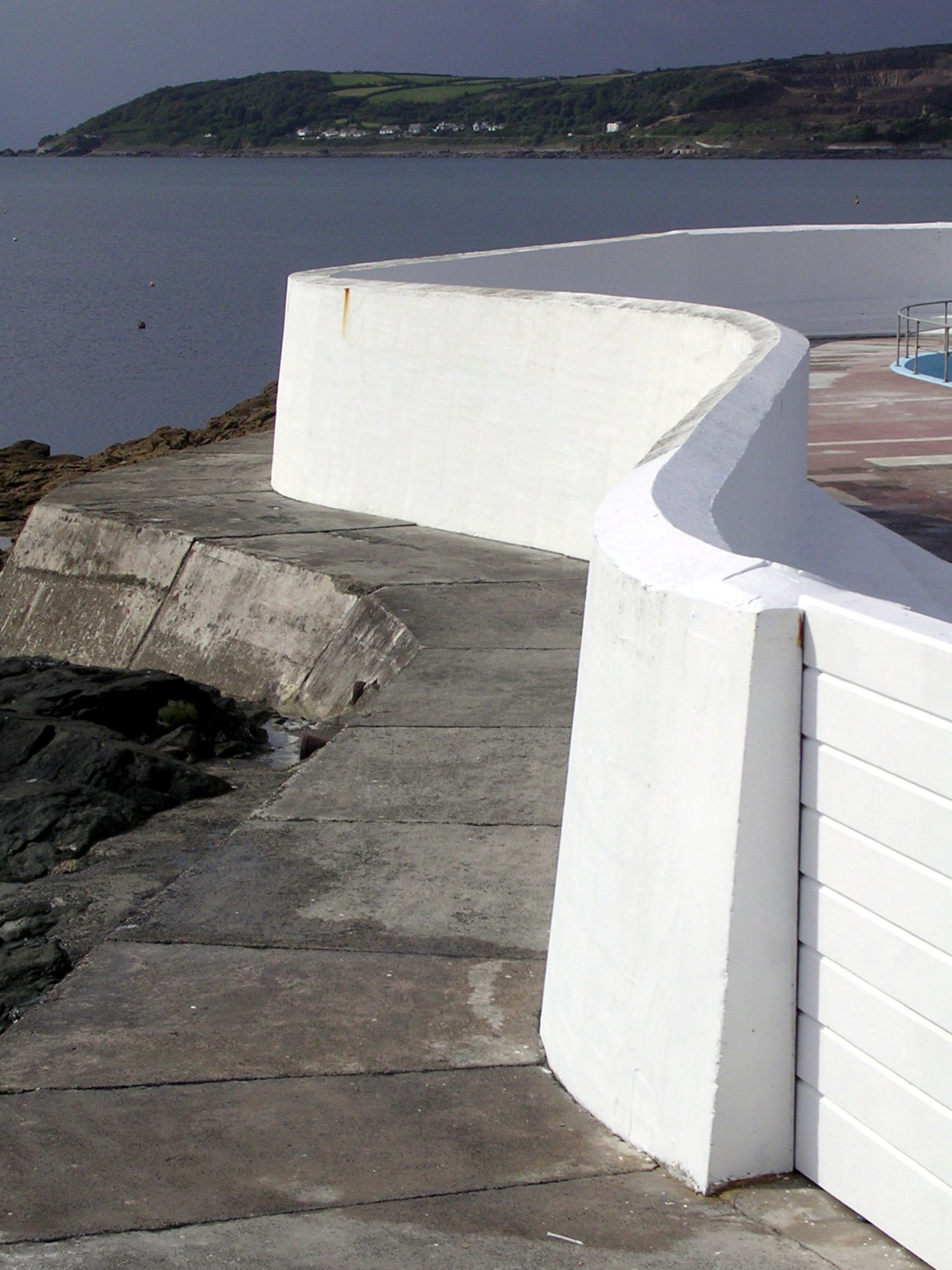
The east wall of Jubilee Pool

Battery Rocks and the adjacent tidal beach, a favourite local spot, are an integral part of the Pen Sans—Holy Headland—after which Penzance is named, having been the site of the original Medieval Church. Battery Rocks have been a location for winter swimmers from at least the 1880s as was mentioned in an 1881 edition of The Cornishman newspaper, which described the practice of the annual Boxing Day swim being enjoyed by the "all-year-round" bathers.

The rocks are on the northern shore of Mount's Bay, and along with the headland, provide shelter for Penzance harbour from the prevailing south-west winds. A rock on the most easterly point is called Carn Olven and on the western side are the Chimney Rocks. Four thousand years ago the sea-level was lower and either side of Battery Rocks, on the beaches at Ponsandane (to the east) and Wherrytown (west), evidence of a ′submerged forest′ can be seen at low tide in the form of several partially fossilised tree trunks. Artefacts dating from the Mesolithic (10,000 to 5,000 BCE) have been found indicating some occupation contemporary with the forest. The submerged forest in the intertidal area between Wherrytown and Long Rock is of national importance and is a Cornwall Geology Site.

They are also home to a variety of wildlife including a colony of rare purple sandpiper (Calidris maritima) which shows a preference for rocky shores. Most of the sandpipers wintering in Cornwall are probably from the Canadian arctic and the rejection of the proposed development of Penzance harbour (see below), reduced the threat to the local flock.

== History ==
In June 1739 war seemed imminent with France, and a Petition for great guns was sent to the Government by the Corporation of Penzance, which was answered on the condition that a battery was built to house them. The Corporation's accounts for 1740 record the spending of almost £200 on clay, lime, stone and labour, and the guns were in place by November 1740. Of the Battery, Craig Weatherhill, local historian and archaeologist wrote:

"The 18th century gun battery site is in fact a good deal older than that and is almost certainly the site mentioned in the report to King Philip of Spain written by Don Carlos de Amezola, commanding officer of the fleet of four Spanish warships that raided Mousehole, Newlyn and Penzance in August 1595."

Captain de Amezola wrote the following words in this report:

"At the same time, the sergeant major Juan de Arnica, on the order of Captain Carlos de Amezola, went with twelve musketeers and arquebusiers in a launch to capture the piece of artillery that was in the fort in Penzance. Although there were English men who came to its defence, the sergeant major got the piece on board and brought it to the flagship."

No other gun battery site is known on the coast at Penzance and this is almost certainly the Battery Rocks site that is the subject of this report. In December 1880 officers and men of the Royal Artillery, based in Saltash, removed the guns from the "Eastern Promenade Battery". In 1886 the battery was referred to as the "Royal Navy gun-house".

In May 1880 the secretary of the Penzance Swimming Association met with the Town Council with a view to improve the facilities for bathers. By July a concrete path covered the most jagged portion of the rocks and the worst of the "unslightly and objectional stagnant pools" had been filled. The Cornishman newspaper reported that the "... early and all-the-year round bathers had their accustomed dip and breakfast on the morning of Boxing day". By 1882, Mr Hodgson Pascoe was a veteran of forty years.

The Penzance War Memorial was unveiled in 1922 on the site of the old battery and any remaining signs of the battery would have disappeared under the Jubilee Pool (bathing pool) completed in 1935. During the second world war the road and bathing pool was fenced and became an anti-aircraft battery operated by the army and Home Guard.

In 2009 the rocks came under threat from the "Route Partnership" scheme, which intended to transform this location into a freight yard for the Isles of Scilly Steamship Company. It became the subject of much local campaigning, however despite objections the controversial scheme achieved planning consent. Ultimately the project was halted by the Dept of Transport who refused to fund the project.

=== Jubilee Pool ===
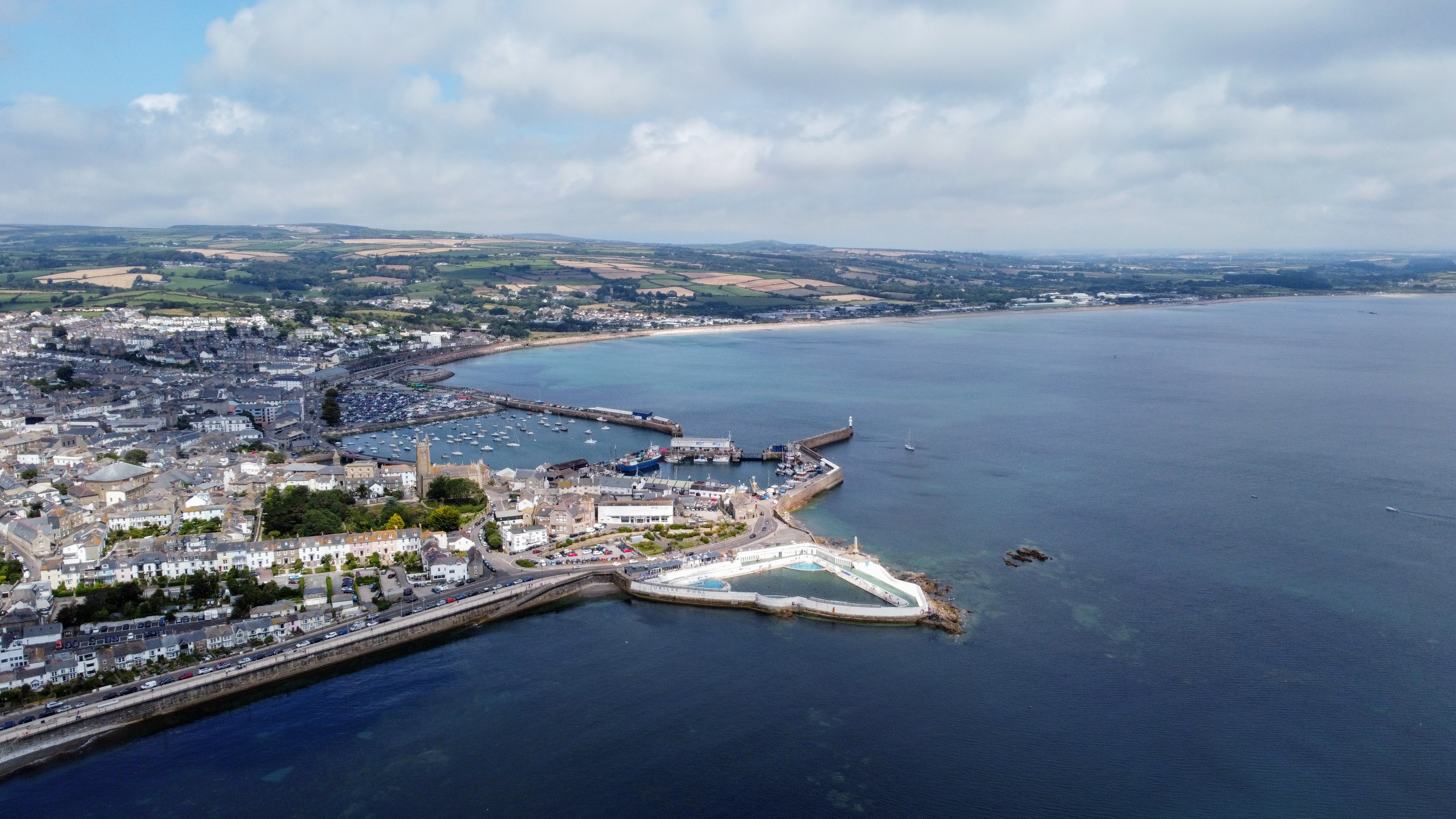
Jubilee Pool Penzance

Opened in May 1935 the bathing pool (or lido) was designed by the Penzance Borough Engineer, Captain F Latham. The lido has a triangular plan, built on rock and juts into the sea. It is made of painted concrete, moulded into a series of Art Deco curves. From the entrance at road level stepped terraces descend to the pool and there is a small shallower children's pool in the War Memorial corner. The Pool is a Grade II listed building and named the Jubilee Pool due to it opening in the year of King George V's Silver Jubilee. By 1992 the pool became dilapidated and following repairs reopened in 1994. In February 2014 there were severe storms which damaged the structure and other serious structural issues were found. Repairs over the next two years cost £2.94 million and the pool reopened in May 2016.
