= Lizard complex =

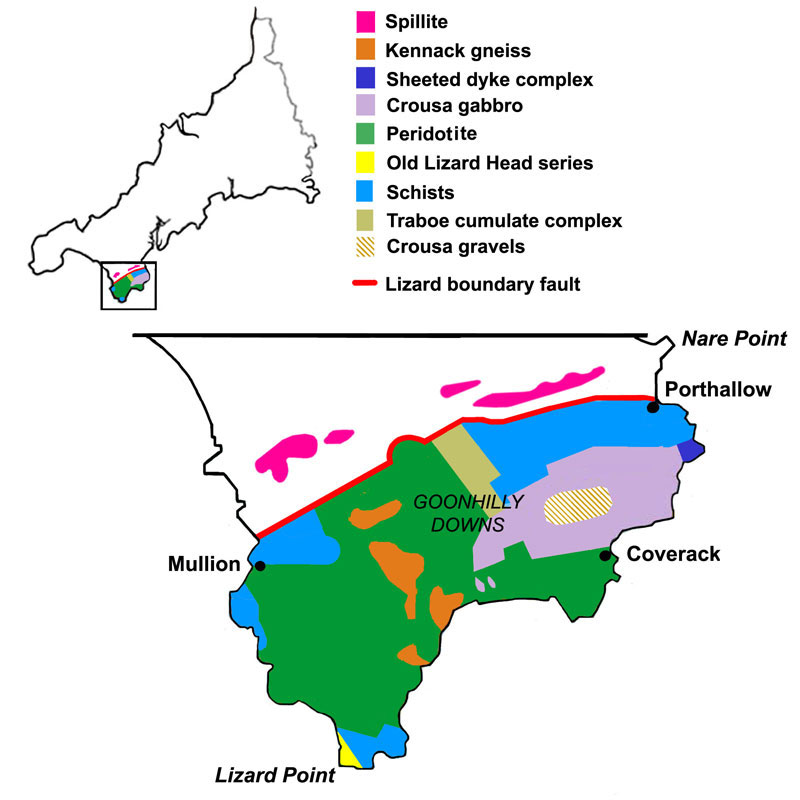
A simplified map showing the geology of the Lizard peninsula, Cornwall

The Lizard complex, Cornwall is generally accepted to represent a preserved example of an exposed ophiolite complex in the United Kingdom. The rocks found in The Lizard area are analogous to those found in such famous areas as the Troodos Mountains, Cyprus and the Semail Ophiolite, Oman.

== Lithologies ==
The Lizard comprises three main units; the serpentinites, the 'oceanic complex' and the metamorphic basement. Since the pioneering work of Bromley and Kirby these suites have been understood to represent a slice through a section of ocean crust, including the upper level of the mantle, thrust onto continental crust.

=== Serpentinites ===
The serpentinites are actually the metamorphosed and deformed remains of the upper layers of the mantle. The metamorphosis has in most cases taken the form of ductile deformation and serpentinisation. In many cases the rocks have also been subject to varying degrees of later brittle deformation. Pre-deformation they would have been a combination of undepleted mantle in the form of lherzolite, peridotite and depleted harzburgite mantle from which basaltic phases had been removed.

On the Lizard these two types of peridotite are represented by a heavily foliated orthopyroxene (enstatite)-rich serpentinite and less foliated, less orthopyroxene rich serpentinite which is typified by the presence of amphibole (tremolite).

The boundary between these two types of serpentinite can be studied at Kynance Cove, and geologically represents the boundary between shallow mantle peridotites from which material has been extracted by melting and deeper peridotite from which no material has been removed.

In the area of Ogo dour at the Northern reaches of Predannack, dunite, a highly depleted peridotite derivative which consists of almost pure olivine, is found.

Earlier theories, most notably the BGS publication "Lizard & the Meneage" that summarised thinking up to the point of publication, proposed that the serpentinite body represented an intruded mass of ultra-mafic material. They believed that the foliations were the result of mass flux within the cooling magma body, and that the different types of serpentinite were the result of an igneous cooling alteration rim.

=== Oceanic complex ===
The oceanic complex consists of the Crousa Gabbro, locally intruded by a suite of dolerite dykes, and a number of schists, split into two broad groups: hornblende schist and mica schist.

The hornblende schist, found in contact with the serpentine mass directly to the North (at Ogo Dour) and to the South (at Pentreath and Church Cove) is the metamorphic remnant of basaltic intrusives into the upper crust. It is typified by a schistose texture and visible crystals of black or dark green hornblende. Structural studies of the hornblende schist indicate that it has been subject to at least three stages of deformation. Folding of the schist at Housel Bay indicates that the formation was also subject to more than one subsequent stage of shear stress.

On the South-east tip of the Lizard the hornblende schist is "inter-bedded" with pale yellow/green veins and pods of epidosite. These bands can extend laterally for many metres and lie in line with the schistose foliations of the surrounding rock. It is unclear what the provenance of these bands is, but theories include that they are the remains of volcanic ash fall during the deposition of the schist protolith, or the calcic remains of thin beds of ocean floor material deposited during less active periods of emplacement of the protolith.

Chemical analysis of the schist draws parallels between it and mantle-derived material found at mid-ocean-ridge and back-arc settings.

=== Basement ===
The basement comprises a group of schists and gneisses of the Old Lizard Head Series and the Man of War gneisses. The Man of War Gneiss is interpreted as a sequence of metamorphosed igneous rocks, possibly intruded as part of the break-up associated with the formation of the ocean. U-Pb dating gives a Late Cambrian age for both the Man of War Gneiss and for intrusions cutting early fabrics in the Old Lizard Head Series

== Structure ==
The current outcrop pattern of the various units of the Lizard Complex is mainly controlled by Carboniferous age normal faulting. The earliest structures seen in the ophiolitic rocks are steeply-dipping foliations thought to represent deformation in lithosphere scale shear zones, associated with continental break-up in the early Devonian. Locally thrust contacts can be seen showing evidence of northwestward movement between parts of the ophiolite and between the ophiolitic rocks and the metamorphic basement. It has been suggested that the Kennack Gneiss (a mixture of basic and acidic igneous rocks) was formed by partial melting during the obduction of the ophiolite onto the continental crust. Although an earlier stage of 'hot' emplacement is not ruled out, it is now generally accepted that in the final stage of emplacement, during the Variscan orogeny, the ophiolite was relatively 'cold'.

The northward dip of thrusts at the base of, and within, the ophiolitic rocks is interpreted to be caused by rotation of initially south-dipping thrust planes due to the dominantly south-dipping post-Variscan extensional faults.

== Timing ==
The formation of the oceanic crust found at the Lizard, its obduction and final emplacement are thought to have happened over a short period of approximately 35 million years during the Devonian period as the Rheic Ocean closed, around 350-400 Mya. This is based on U-Pb dating of zircons from various parts of the complex.

== See also ==
- Geology of Cornwall
