= Kennack Sands =

Beach in Cornwall, England

Kennack Sands Porth Keunek (Cornish)
- Beach
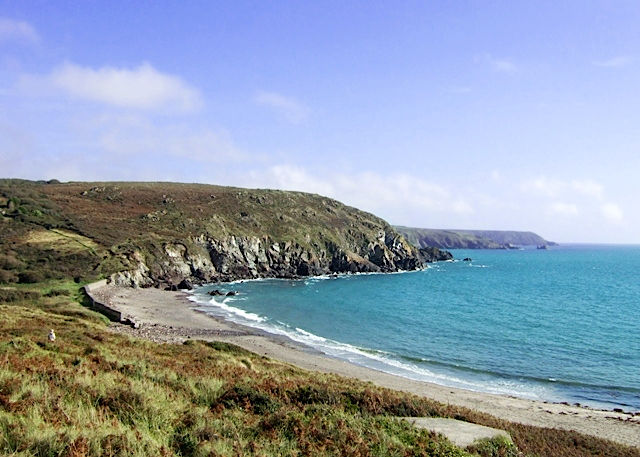
- Interactive map of Kennack Sands
- Coordinates: 50.006153°N 5.162469°W

Dimensions
  - Length: 0.5 km (0.31 mi)

Kennack Sands (Cornish: Porth Keunek, meaning reedbed cove) is a beach and sand-dune system on the east coast of the Lizard Peninsula, Cornwall, England, UK.

== Geography ==
The beach is approximately 500 metres (1,600 ft) long and backed by cliffs, Kennack Towans (Cornish: Tewyn Keunek), a sand-dune system, and Carn Kennack (Cornish: Karn Keunek). Inland is the abandoned Gwendreath Quarry. The beach is used for recreation and divided into two by an outcrop of rocks called the Caerverracks. Kennack Sands has a gently sloping beach so the beach width varies considerably with the tide. There is a rocky outcrop that splits the beach into two so the beach may be referred to as Kennack Sands west and Kennack Sands East. The rock that splits the beaches is called Caerverracks and the hill above this Carn Kennack. There is a path that runs over Carn Kennack allowing access to the east beach which is a designated nature reserve.

It is a popular site for launching inflatables for underwater diving. Less than 400 metres (1,300 ft) off-shore the depth of water is over 16 metres (52 ft).

The nearest village is Kuggar, 1 kilometre (0.62 miles) inland. There is a car park and café on the western side of the beach and on the road to Kuggar there are caravan and camping sites.

== History ==
Pill boxes and an anti-tank wall were built on the back of the beach in case of invasion during the Second World War.
