= Church Cove =

Hamlet in Cornwall, England

Coordinates: 49.9696°N 5.1936°W

Church Cove: Cornish: Porth Eglos
- Location within Cornwall
- OS grid reference: SW711125
- Unitary authority: Cornwall
- Ceremonial county: Cornwall
- Region: South West
- Country: England
- Sovereign state: United Kingdom
- Post town: HELSTON
- Postcode district: TR12
- Dialling code: 01326
- Police: Devon and Cornwall
- Fire: Cornwall
- Ambulance: South Western
- UK Parliament: St Ives

For Church Cove, Gunwalloe, see Gunwalloe

Church Cove (Cornish: Porth Eglos) is a hamlet in the civil parish of Landewednack in Cornwall, England. Its nearest town is Helston, which lies approximately 10.1 miles (16.3 km) north-west from the hamlet. The parish is notable for being the most southern point on British mainland.

Church Cove lies within the Cornwall Area of Outstanding Natural Beauty (AONB).

Parts of the hamlet lie within Caerthillian to Kennack SSSI (Site of Special Scientific Interest).
