= SS Gairsoppa =

UK cargo ship sunk in the Battle of the Atlantic

History

United Kingdom
- Name: 1919: War Roebuck; 1919: Gairsoppa
- Namesake: Gerusoppa
- Owner: British India SN Co
- Port of registry: Glasgow
- Builder: Palmers Sb & I Co, Jarrow
- Yard number: 894
- Launched: 12 August 1919
- Completed: 17 October 1919
- Renamed: after launching
- Identification: UK official number 141924; until 1933: code letters KCRV; from 1930: call sign GCZB
- Fate: Sunk by torpedo, 1941

General characteristics
- Class & type: War Standard B type cargo ship
- Tonnage: 5,237 GRT, 3,227 NRT, 8,150 DWT
- Length: 412.0 ft (125.6 m) overall; 399.3 ft (121.7 m) registered
- Beam: 52.2 ft (15.9 m)
- Draught: 25 ft 3 in (7.70 m)
- Depth: 28.5 ft (8.7 m)
- Decks: 2
- Installed power: 517 NHP or 3,000 ihp
- Propulsion: 1 × triple-expansion engine; 1 × screw
- Speed: 11.7 knots (21.7 km/h)
- Capacity: 4 passengers
- Crew: 84 + 2 DEMS gunners
- Armament: DEMS in WW2

SS Gairsoppa was a British cargo steamship that was built in 1919 and sunk in the Battle of the Atlantic in 1941. 85 of her complement were killed, and only one person survived. When she was sunk, her cargo included an estimated 7 million ounces of silver bullion. In 2012 and 2013 a US company recovered part of the bullion, and in 2014 the Royal Mint struck 20,000 silver coins from it.

Gairsoppa was a War Standard "B" type steamship: one of a set of designs ordered by the UK Shipping Controller in large numbers to replace merchant ships lost during the First World War. She was launched as War Roebuck, but renamed before she was completed. The British India Steam Navigation Company (BI) owned and managed her throughout her career.

The ship was named after either the village of Gerusoppa in Karnataka, southern India, or the Jog Falls near Gerusoppa, which India's British rulers called Gairsoppa Falls. Gerusoppa was once the capital of the Vijayanagara Empire, and has the remains of a 16th-century Jain temple.

== Building ==
In 1919 and 1920 BI acquired 16 new "B" type cargo ships from various UK shipbuilders. The Shipping Controller had ordered each of them with a standard "War ____" name. BI renamed each of them with a name beginning with "G"; either before they were launched; or between launch and completion.

Gairsoppa was the first of four "B" type ships that BI acquired from Palmers Shipbuilding and Iron Company, who had shipyards on the River Tyne at Hebburn and Jarrow. Palmers also built War Zebra, which BI renamed Gurna; War Llama, which BI renamed Gamaria, and War Reynard, which BI renamed Garmula.

Palmers built Gairsoppa at Hebburn as yard number 894. She was launched as War Roebuck on 12 August 1919, renamed Gairsoppa, and completed on 17 October that year. Her lengths were 412.0 ft (125.6 m) overall and 399.3 ft (121.7 m) registered. Her beam was 52.2 ft (15.9 m), her depth was 28.5 ft (8.7 m), and her draught was 25 ft 3 in (7.70 m). Her tonnages were 5,237 GRT, 3,227 NRT, and 8,150 DWT. She had berths for four passengers.

Gairsoppa had a single screw, driven by a three-cylinder triple-expansion engine built by Palmers. It was rated at 517 NHP or 3,000 ihp, She achieved 11.7 knots (21.7 km/h) on her sea trials.

== Peacetime career ==
BI registered Gairsoppa at Glasgow. Her official number was 141924 and her code letters were KCRV. The ship was equipped for wireless telegraphy from new. On 29 April 1930 Gairsoppa grounded at Fulta Point in the Hooghly River in West Bengal. She was refloated undamaged under her own power later that day. By 1930 Gairsoppa's call sign was GCZB. In 1934 this superseded her code letters.

== Loss ==
Toward the end of 1940 Gairsoppa left Calcutta bound for the UK. In the first week of January 1941 she called at Durban and Cape Town in South Africa. On 22 January she arrived off Freetown in Sierra Leone, where she waited to join a convoy to the UK. Her cargo included 2,600 tons of pig iron, 1,765 tons of tea, 2,369 tons of general cargo, 200 tons of silver ingots and coins, and a consignment of mail. The silver was worth £600,000 in 1941, and was destined for the Royal Mint to mint new coins. Gairsoppa's crew comprised 11 UK officers, crewmen, and DEMS gunners; 84 lascars; and one Chinese carpenter.

On 30 January 1941 Gairsoppa left Freetown with SL 64: a convoy of 30 merchant ships bound for Liverpool. However, heavy weather slowed the convoy, and Gairsoppa's bunkers ran low. On 15 February her Master, Captain Gerald Hyland, detached her from SL64, reduced her speed to 5 knots (9 km/h) to conserve coal, and changed course for the nearest sheltered anchorage, which was Galway Bay in neutral Ireland for bunkering.

A German Focke-Wulf Fw 200 aircraft circled Gairsoppa at 08:00 on 16 February. Then U-101 sighted her at 1800 hrs, but heavy seas delayed its attack. U-101 fired a spread of two torpedoes at 2328 hrs and a third torpedo at 2332 hrs, all of which missed. At 0008 hrs on 17 February U-101 fired a fourth torpedo, which hit the starboard side of Gairsoppa's number 2 hold. The ship caught fire and settled by the bow. At 0020 hrs U-101 fired a fifth torpedo as a coup de grâce, but it missed.

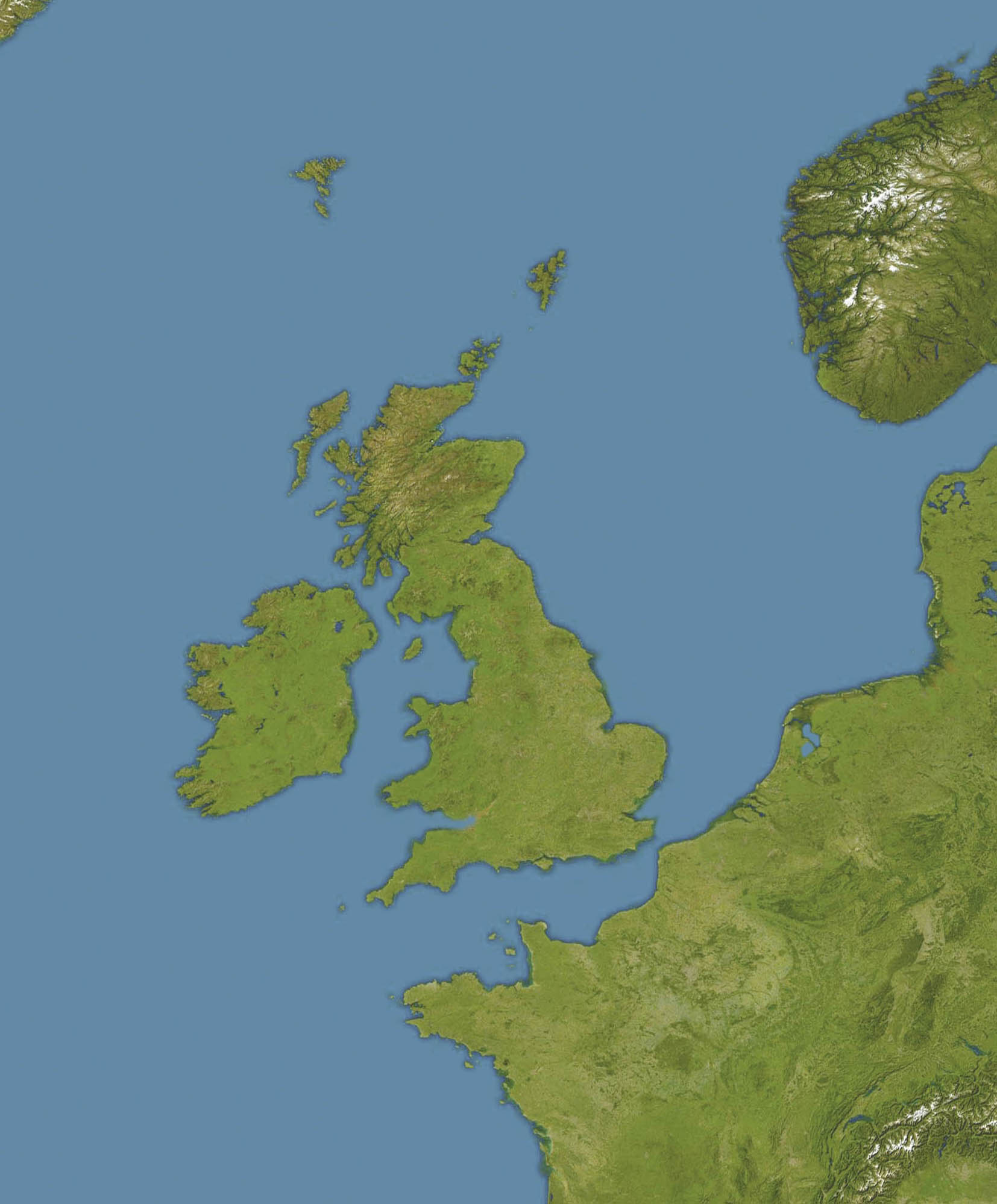
Position where U-101 sank Gairsoppa in the Western Approaches

Gairsoppa's crew abandoned ship in three of her lifeboats, and she sank about 20 minutes after being hit. Her reported position was in the Western Approaches at 50°00′N 14°0′W, about 300 nautical miles (560 km) southwest of Galway Bay. The boats became separated in the heavy sea. Two of the boats, and their occupants, were never seen again.

== Lifeboat voyage ==
The other boat, commanded by Second Officer Richard Ayres, contained eight European and 23 lascar crew. Ayres used a sea anchor to lay to until dawn, and then set sail and set a course east. The boat's rudder was broken, so Ayres used an oar to steer.

The boat was victualled with drinking water, hardtack, and cans of condensed milk. Ayres rationed the provisions, but the drinking water ran out after eight days. In the first seven days, all but seven men died from either exposure or drinking seawater. The boat's remaining occupants contracted frostbite.

On 1 March 1941 Ayres' boat sighted the Lizard Lighthouse on the coast of Cornwall. The men were too weak to row, but they shortened sail. As they neared the shore, in Caerthillian Cove, in the parish of Landewednack, a wave overturned the boat, drowning four of the men. Another wave righted the boat again, and Ayres dragged himself, the radio officer, and a deck hand back into the boat. Another wave overturned the boat a second time. The three men clung to the keel, but the radio officer was swept away.

Ayres and the deck hand reached the shore. The deck hand got onto a rock, but a wave swept him off and he was killed. A group of three evacuee schoolgirls was walking on the clifftop and saw the incident. One of the girls ran down to the beach, while another alerted a local farmworker, Brian Richards, who was also a member of HM Coastguard. He arrived in time to pull Ayres unconscious from the sea, as the only survivor.

Ayres was carried to a local house, and then admitted to the cottage hospital at Helston. The bodies of the radio officer, deck hand, and two of the lascars were recovered, and are buried in the yard of St Wynwallow's Church, Landewednack.

== Monuments ==
The 11 European officers and men who were killed are commemorated on panel 51 of the Second World War monument at Tower Hill Memorial in London. The Chinese carpenter and 69 of the lascars who were killed are commemorated on a roll of honour, one copy of which is held at Chittagong War Cemetery in Bangladesh, and the other at the Indian Seamen's Home at Mumbai in India.

== Richard Ayres ==
In November 1941 Ayres was made an MBE for his efforts to save his shipmates. Lloyd's of London awarded him Lloyd's War Medal for Bravery at Sea. He spent nine months on full pension to recover, and then returned to sea with BI. He later was promoted to captain, joined the Royal Naval Reserve, and then became a BI cargo superintendent, first in India and later in Malaya. He retired in 1964, and died in 1992.

== Salvage ==
=== Silver bullion ===
In 1989 the UK government invited tenders to salvage Gairsoppa's silver bullion. Deepwater Recovery and Exploration Ltd submitted the only bid received. In 2011 the Government awarded a contract to a US company, Odyssey Marine Exploration, to find and salvage the estimated 7,000,000 troy ounces (220 tonnes) of silver from Gairsoppa, and also 600,000 troy ounces (19 tonnes) of silver from the wreck of another BI ship, Mantola, that a U-boat had sunk in 1917, and whose wreck is only about 60 nautical miles (110 km) from Gairsoppa's.

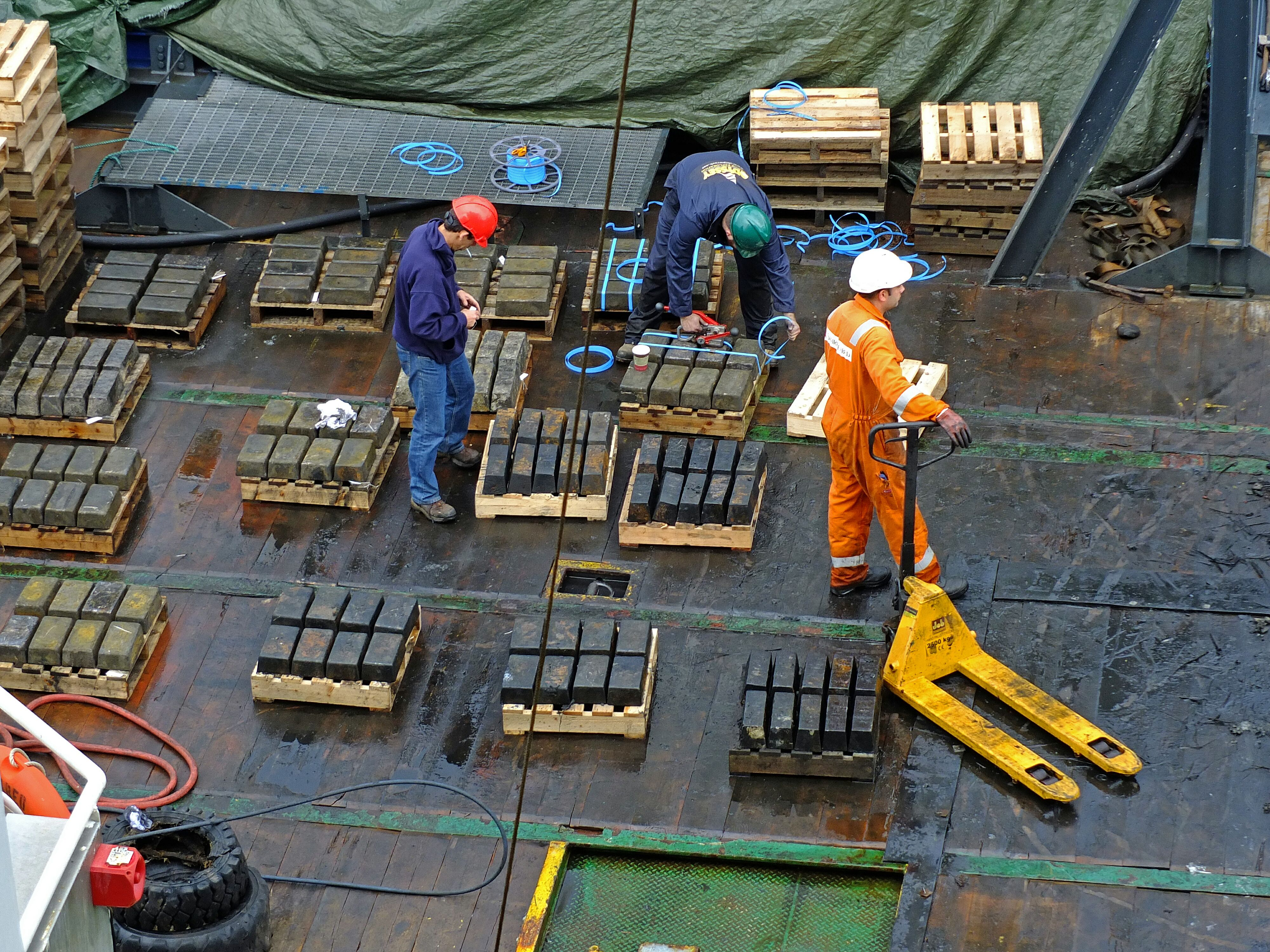
Salvors inspecting some of the silver recovered from Gairsoppa in 2013

On 25 September 2011 Odyssey announced that, using an ROV, it had found and identified Gairsoppa's wreck. It is on the seabed at a depth of nearly 4,700 metres (3 miles). The New York Times published on its website a video that Odyssey had made of the wreck. Odyssey stated that it believed the wreck held a total of about 240 short tons (220 tonnes) of silver.

In July 2012 it was reported that Odyssey had recovered 1,400,000 troy ounces (44 tonnes) of silver in 1,203 ingots, and landed them at Bristol in England. Odyssey was to keep 80 percent of the value and 20 percent would go to HM Treasury. On 23 July 2013 it was reported that Odyssey had recovered a further 1,574 ingots, totalling almost 1,800,000 troy ounces (56 tonnes). This increased the cumulative total of silver salvaged to 110 short tons (100 tonnes), a record for both the amount of precious metal salvaged, and the depth from which it was raised. This represented 99 percent of the insured bullion that Gairsoppa was carrying. Lloyd's record of war losses suggests that other Government-owned silver, uninsured, may have been aboard the ship. However, Odyssey stated that it had not found any of the uninsured silver.

Correspondence between the Royal Mint and the Bank of England in 1941, after Gairsoppa was sunk, reveals that it was feared that they were within two months of running out of silver, and might have to suspend the minting of new silver coins.

462 of the original silver ingots, minted at the Royal Mint's Bombay location, were made available to the purchasing public. In September 2013 some of the silver was delivered to the Royal Mint, now based in Llantrisant, Wales, to be minted into coins. In April 2014 the Royal Mint announced that it would strike 20,000 commemorative 1/4 ounce coins from the silver, each with a face value of 50 pence, but priced at £30.

=== Mail and other artefacts ===
Other artefacts that Odyssey recovered from Gairsoppa included artefacts used by the crew, and bags of mail destined for the UK. The great depth of the wreck preserved the mail from the decaying effects of oxygen, light, and heat. However, being submerged in water for seven decades also made the mail very fragile. There were 717 letters: the largest amount of mail yet recovered from a shipwreck. It took four years to conserve them; stabilising them; reassembling letters that had fragmented; and transcribing their texts. The mail was restored by two conservators at AOC Archaeology in Edinburgh and two at the Postal Museum, London. In 2018 the museum displayed some of the mail and other artefacts in an exhibition called "Voices from the Deep".

== Bibliography ==
- Haws, Duncan (1987). British India S.N. Co. Merchant Fleets. Vol. 11. Burwash: Travel Creatours Ltd Publications. ISBN 0-946378-07-X.
- Lloyd's Register of Shipping. Vol. II.–Steamers. London: Lloyd's Register of Shipping. 1920 – via Internet Archive.
- Lloyd's Register of Shipping (PDF). Vol. II.–Steamers. London: Lloyd's Register of Shipping. 1934 – via Southampton City Council.
- Mercantile Navy List. London. 1920 – via Crew List Index Project.
- Mercantile Navy List. London. 1930 – via Crew List Index Project.
- Robinson, Janet (May 2019). "A Birchington hero and the sunken treasure" (PDF). Newsletter. No. 68. Birchington-on-Sea: Birchington Heritage Trust.
