= Erisey =

Manor in Grade, Cornwall, England

Erisey Barton
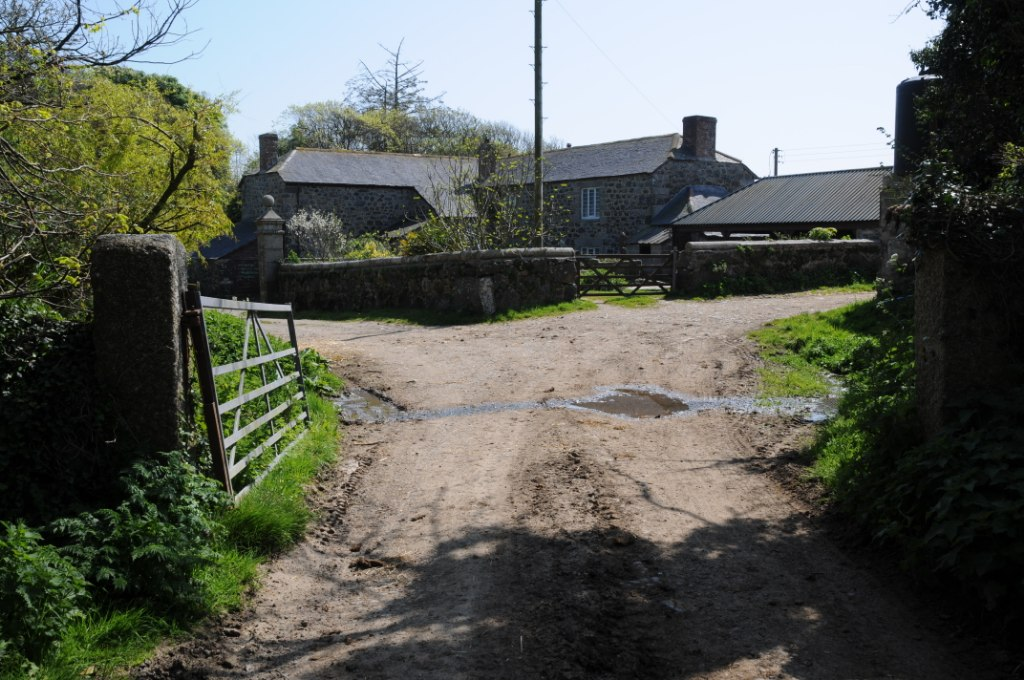

- Location within Cornwall
- 50.01669°N 5.196634°W
- Location: Grade–Ruan, Cornwall, England

Listed Building – Grade II
- Official name: Erisey Manor House
- Designated: 10 July 1957
- Reference no.: 1157968

Erisey (Cornish: Erysi) was a manor on the Lizard Peninsula, Cornwall, UK and is the surname of the family that built the house. The manor was originally in the civil parish of Grade, and since 1934, Grade-Ruan. The Grade II listed building was built by Richard Erisey in the 17th century and in the 18th-century was owned by the Boscawen family of Tregothnan.

== Geography ==
Erisey is named as Erisey Barton on the Ordnance Survey (grid reference SW710179) and is on the Lizard Peninsula, at the southern end of Goonhilly Downs and 1 mile (1.6 km) to the east of the A3083 Helston to Lizard (village) road.

== History ==
The Erisey family can be traced back to the reign of Edward I (1239–1307). James Erisey (died 1522) was the Sheriff of Cornwall in 1513 and there is a brass memorial recording his death and that of his wife, Margaret in the parish church. Another James Erisey was born at Erisey and was a privateer with Sir Francis Drake. The house was built in the shape of a letter E by Richard Erisey in 1620. John Erisey added gardens before he died in about 1671 and the last male descendant, Richard, died in 1722. Admiral Boscawen (1711–1761) of Tregothnan purchased the property from the co-heiresses of the Erisey family sometime in the middle of the 18th century. The present building was probably built in the late 18th or early 19th-century.

Oliver Rackham, who studied the history and development of the countryside considered the pattern of farms and fields on the Lizard to be largely complete by the 14th century. He considered the 1,000 acres (400 ha) Erisey estate to be an example of ″in-field and out-field system″ with small, highly cultivated fields near the house surrounded by the moorland of the manor, and separated from the wider moorland by a great outer wall.

John and Jane Lory (nee Gilbert) were the first Lory inhabitants at Erisey Manor. It is not clear when they moved here but according to Birth records, their first Son was born at Erisey in 1807 and they continued to live there with their youngest Daughter, Thirza, being born at Erisey in 1828.

The Lorys were a distinguished family of St. Keverne. John being the fourth Son of Jacob and Alice Lory. A memorial tablet, erected in 1836, is on display at St. Keverne Church and is dedicated to Jacob and Alice's memory.

In 1880 the estate was owned by Evelyn Boscawen, 6th Viscount Falmouth, occupied by a Mr James James and consisted of 177 acres of arable and pasture land, dwelling house and buildings. A To Let notice for a new tenant was published in The Cornishman in July 1880.
