= St Ruan =

Coordinates: 49°59′30″N 5°11′18″W

St Ruan is a hamlet in the civil parish of Grade-Ruan, west Cornwall, England, United Kingdom.
