= James Erisey =

James Erisey was born at Erisey House near Mullion, in the parish of Grade in Cornwall. He sailed as a privateer with Sir Francis Drake.

In 1585 Drake hired James Erisey to captain a man-o-war, following a message from Queen Elizabeth I that "privateers were at liberty to attack Spanish shipping".

In 1586 he was again part of a fleet led by Drake. He was also one of the early colonists of Roanoke Island. Erisey was captain of the "White Lion", a private warship owned by Charles Lord Howard of Effingham, who at the time was Lord Admiral of England.

In 1588 he was at Plymouth with Drake when they sailed out to fight the Spanish Armada invasion fleet. Also in Drake's fleet was Sir Richard Grenville, who was Erisey's cousin.
