= Grade–Ruan =

Civil parish in England

Coordinates: 50.00°N 5.19°W

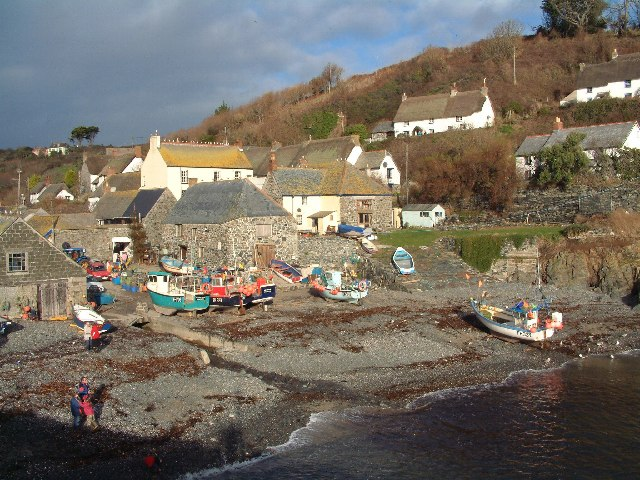
- The fishing port of Cadgwith is in Grade-Ruan parish

- Location within Cornwall
- Population: 936 (2011 census)
- Civil parish: Grade–Ruan
- Unitary authority: Cornwall
- Shire county: Cornwall
- Region: South West
- Country: England
- Sovereign state: United Kingdom
- Police: Devon and Cornwall
- Fire: Cornwall
- Ambulance: South Western

Grade–Ruan is a civil parish on the Lizard peninsula in Cornwall, England, approximately ten miles (16 km) south of Falmouth.

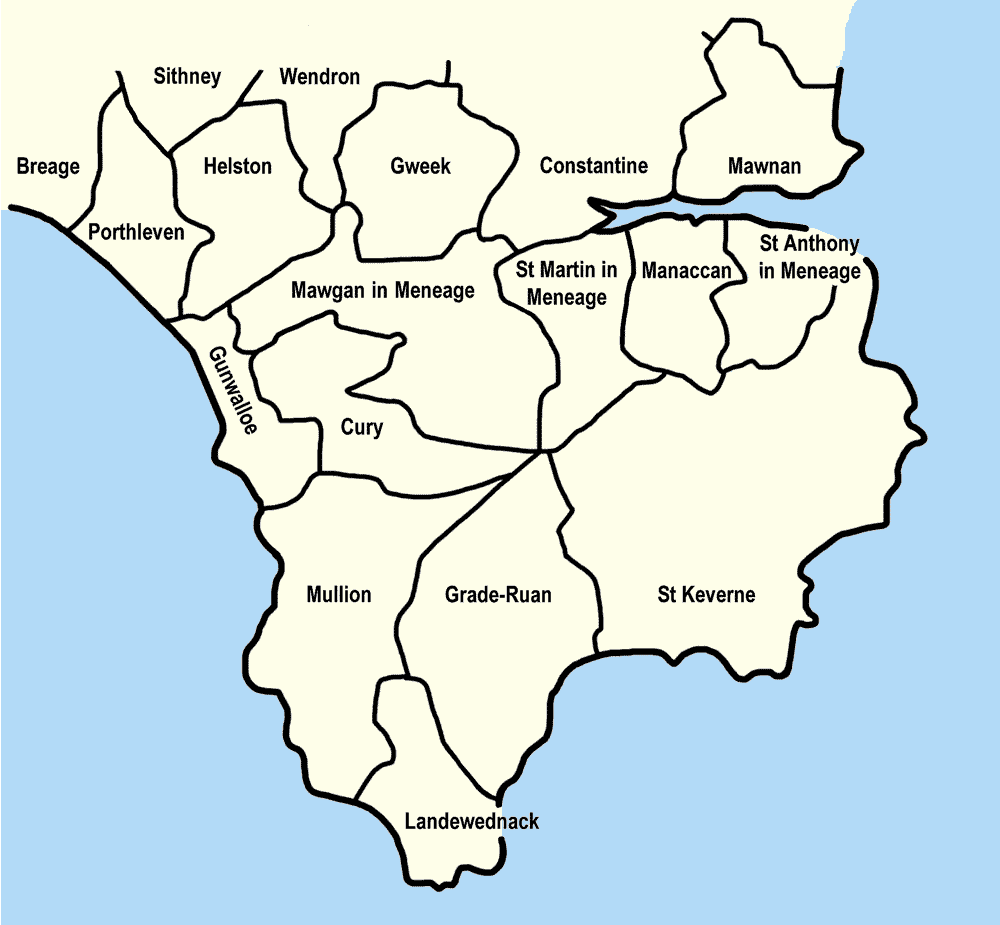
Grade-Ruan in relation to neighbouring parishes

It is a rural parish bounded to the east by St Keverne parish and by the sea; to the west by Mullion and Cury parishes; and to the south by Landewednack parish.

Grade–Ruan civil parish encompasses part of Goonhilly Downs and the major settlements are Ruan Minor, St Ruan and Cadgwith. The parish was formed in 1934 because falling population necessitated merging the ecclesiastical parishes of Grade, Ruan Major and Ruan Minor. All three were in the Deanery and Hundred of Kerrier. Formerly, Cadgwith was partly in Grade parish and partly in Ruan Minor parish.

The population of Grade–Ruan has increased steadily; it was 677 in 1961, 835 in 1981, 1070 in 2001, and 936 in 2011. There is a school in the parish, Grade Ruan CE Primary School, which is situated in Ruan Minor.

Grade–Ruan lies within the Cornwall Area of Outstanding Natural Beauty (AONB).

The parish churches of the three former parishes are St Grada at Grade, and the churches of Ruan Major and Ruan Minor, the latter two dedicated to St Rumonus. All three have towers though Ruan Minor Church tower is very small. Ruan Major Church was greatly altered by Edmund Sedding in 1867 and is now a ruin. The church of Ruan Major lay within the manor of Winnianton; its benefice was united with that of Landewednack in 1754. (There was in medieval times a chapel at Hendra.) The church of St Rumon in Ruan Major is a grade I listed building.

The church of Ruan Minor also lay within the manor of Winnianton; it was a separate rectory in 1277. The church is a small mainly 15th century building and has a Norman piscina.

Erisey Manor House (originally in the parish of Grade) is a Grade II listed farmhouse. The oldest part is part of a house built in an E shape in 1620; this has been incorporated in an 18th-century rebuilding and extensions. The 1620 house was built by Richard Erisey; the Erisey male line came to an end in 1772. James Erisey was born at an earlier Erisey House; he sailed as a privateer with Sir Francis Drake.
