= Lizard (village) =

Village in Cornwall, England

Coordinates: 49.967°N 5.200°W

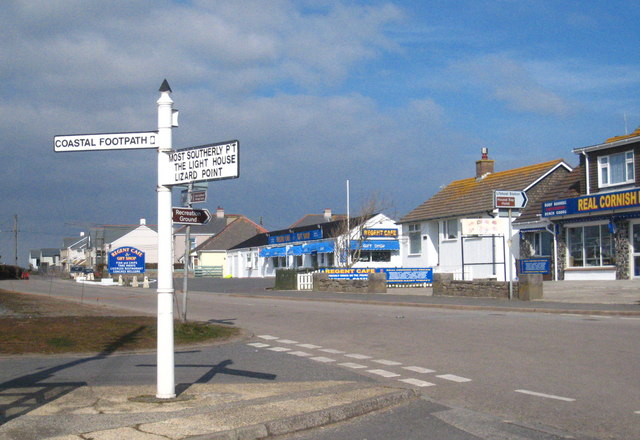
Lizard village

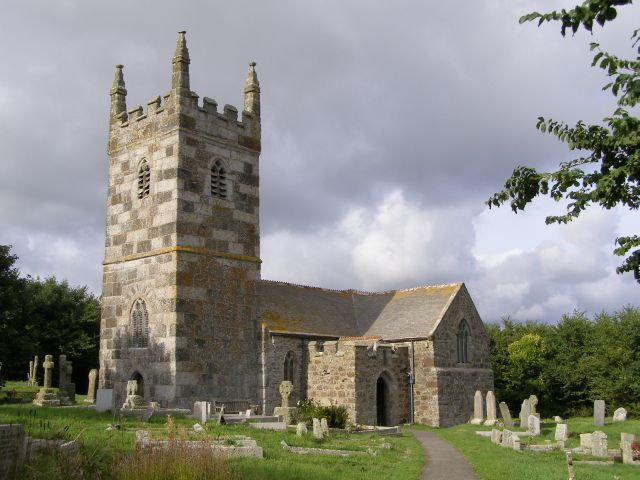
St Wynwallow's Church, Landewednack

Lizard (Cornish: Lysardh), also known as The Lizard, The Lizard Town, or The Lizard Village, is a village on the Lizard peninsula in Cornwall, England, United Kingdom. It is situated about ten miles (16 km) south of Helston, and is mainland Britain's most southerly settlement. Lizard is a tourist centre and its large village green is surrounded by cafes and gift shops.

The name derives from the Cornish lys for 'court' and ardh for 'high'. The village is in the civil parish of Landewednack, the most southerly parish on the British mainland.

The village of Lizard is mentioned in the Domesday Book of 1086 as a relatively small settlement and lying within the hundred of Winnianton.

The parish church is dedicated to St Winwaloe and is the most southerly in mainland Britain. It is built of local serpentinite stone (see Lizard complex for more information on the peninsula's geology) and is situated in the hamlet of Landewednack, now a suburb of Lizard village.

Lizard Lighthouse, the oldest mainland light in Cornwall, is situated half-a-mile (800 m) south of the village. It has twin towers and was erected in 1752 although there had been a light here since 1619. The Lizard Lifeboat Station, operated by the RNLI, is situated at Kilcobben Cove half-a-mile (800 m) east of the village.

The Spanish Armada was first spotted from near Lizard village in 1588.

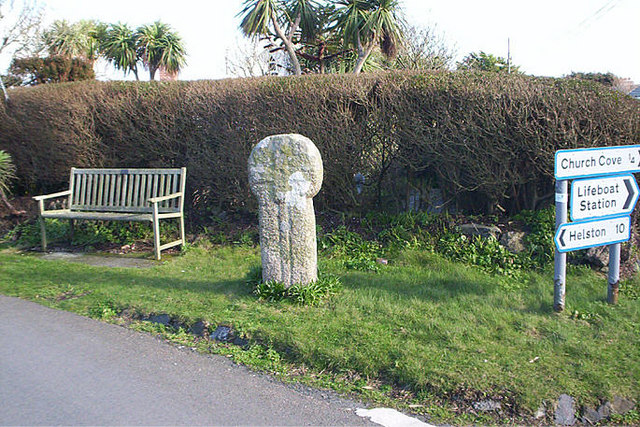
The Cornish cross

There is a Cornish cross in the village.

Lizard village is the only mainland settlement in the UK that lies below 50 degrees North Latitude.
