= St Wynwallow's Church, Landewednack =

Church in Cornwall

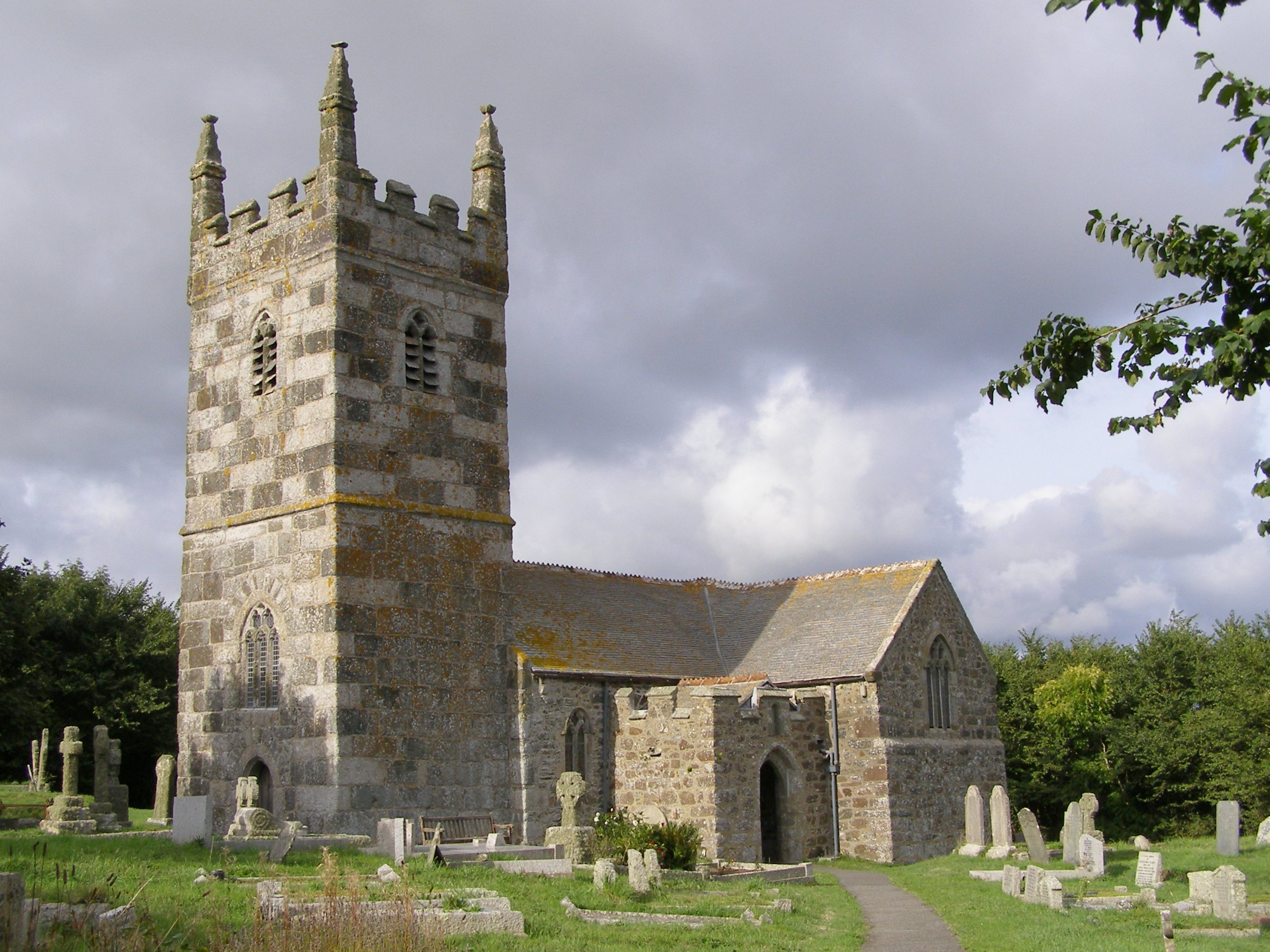
- St Wynwallow's Church
- St Wynwallow's Church, Landewednack
- 49°58′14″N 05°11′36″W
- OS grid reference: SW 711 127
- Denomination: Church of England
- Churchmanship: Broad Church

History
- Dedication: St Wynwallow

Administration
- Province: Canterbury
- Diocese: Truro
- Archdeaconry: Cornwall
- Parish: Landewednack
- Location within Cornwall

Listed Building – Grade I
- Official name: Church of St Winwalaus
- Designated: 9 October 1984
- Reference no.: 1141920

St Wynwallow's Church, Landewednack, is the Church of England parish church of Landewednack in Cornwall, England, United Kingdom. It is the most southerly church in mainland Britain and is about ten miles (16 km) south of Helston. It was founded about 600 AD. The oldest parts of the current building are 11th-century.

== Building ==
The church is dedicated to St Winwaloe, who was the third son of a Cornish couple who moved to Brittany. There he founded the monastery of Landévennec. There is no evidence that he visited Cornwall, and the church may have been founded by one of the monks from Landévennec, or perhaps by St Winwaloe's elder brother, Wennac. Nothing remains of the original building.

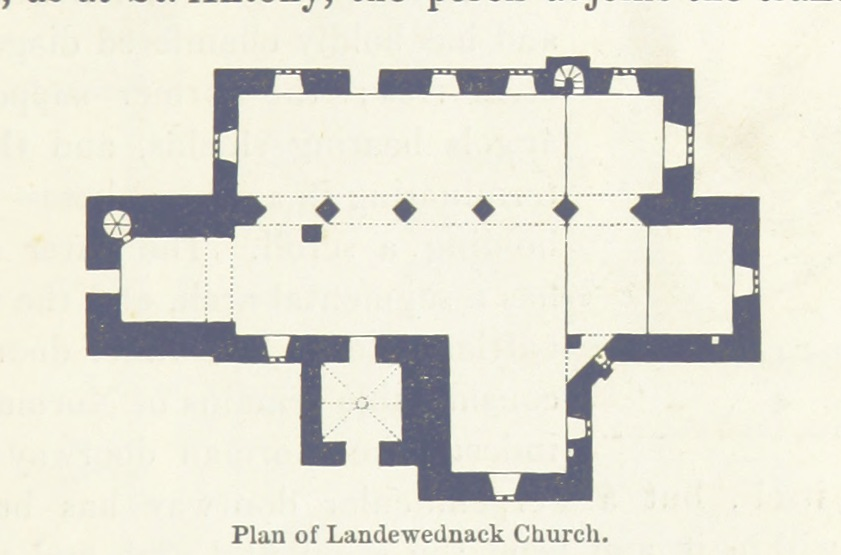
Floor plan of the building

The oldest part of the current church building is the 11th-century Norman south doorway, which has serpentinite columns. The south doorway is inside a Gothic south porch that is either 13th- or 14th-century, and is rib-vaulted. The church has a south transept, whose east window is 13th-century. Also 13th-century are the piscinas in the chancel and south transept. There is a hagioscope from the south transept to the chancel.

The west tower was rebuilt early in the 15th century. It is built of blocks of granite and serpentinite, mixed randomly. The font is granite, inscribed "IHC and D RIC BOLHAM ME FECIT c1404", and set on four small 19th-century syenite shafts. "RIC BOLHAM" is Richard Bolham, who was Rector from 1404 until 1442.

There is a north aisle of five bays, which was added early in the 16th century. Its east and north windows are Perpendicular Gothic. The south window of the south transept and the west window of the west tower are also Perpendicular.

The building was restored in the 1860s. The base of the serpentinite pulpit is dated 1860. There is a Victorian lectern made of polished serpentinite. Other 19th-century features include the glass in the west and northwest windows of the north aisle. The restoration removed a rood screen and rood loft that screened the chancel from the nave. The vestry is 20th-century. The building is now Grade I listed.

== Bells ==
The west tower has a ring of six bells, hung for change ringing. William Chamberlain of Aldgate, London, cast the fifth bell in about 1456, making it one of the oldest church bells in Cornwall. Thomas Bullisdon of London cast two of the bells in about 1515: the current fourth bell, and a tenor bell. That tenor is now disused, and displayed on the church floor. In 1937 John Taylor & Co of Loughborough cast four new bells: the tenor currently in use, and the first, second, and third bells. Unusually, the 15th-century fifth bell is heavier than the current tenor. It is also heavier than the now disused 16th-century tenor.

== Churchyard ==
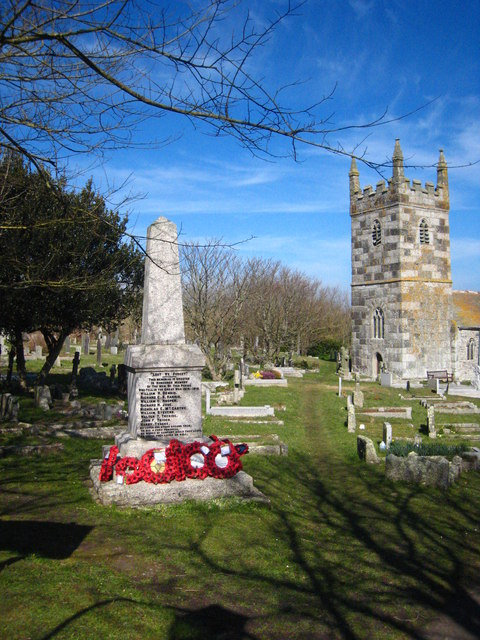
The parish war memorial (centre left), with the west tower on the right

St Wynwallow's churchyard includes a war memorial and a small number of Commonwealth War Graves Commission burials. Four of the graves are of seafarers who survived the sinking of the cargo ship Gairsoppa on 17 February 1941, followed by 13 days in an open lifeboat, but were killed on 1 March when their boat capsized in Caerthillian Cove. They are a radio officer, a deck hand, and two unidentified Muslim lascars.

== Parish ==
The last Cornish language sermon was preached here in 1674, though this claim has also been made for the churches of Towednack and Ludgvan.

The settlements of Grade, Ruan Major and Ruan Minor were united into a single civil parish called Grade-Ruan in 1934. The former parish church of Ruan Major is now in ruins. St Wynwallow's church is part of a group of parishes comprising:

- St Grada & Holy Cross Church, Grade
- St Wynwallow's Church, Landewednack
- St Rumon's Church, Ruan Minor
- St Mary's Church, Cadgwith
