= Conservation and restoration of shipwreck artifacts =

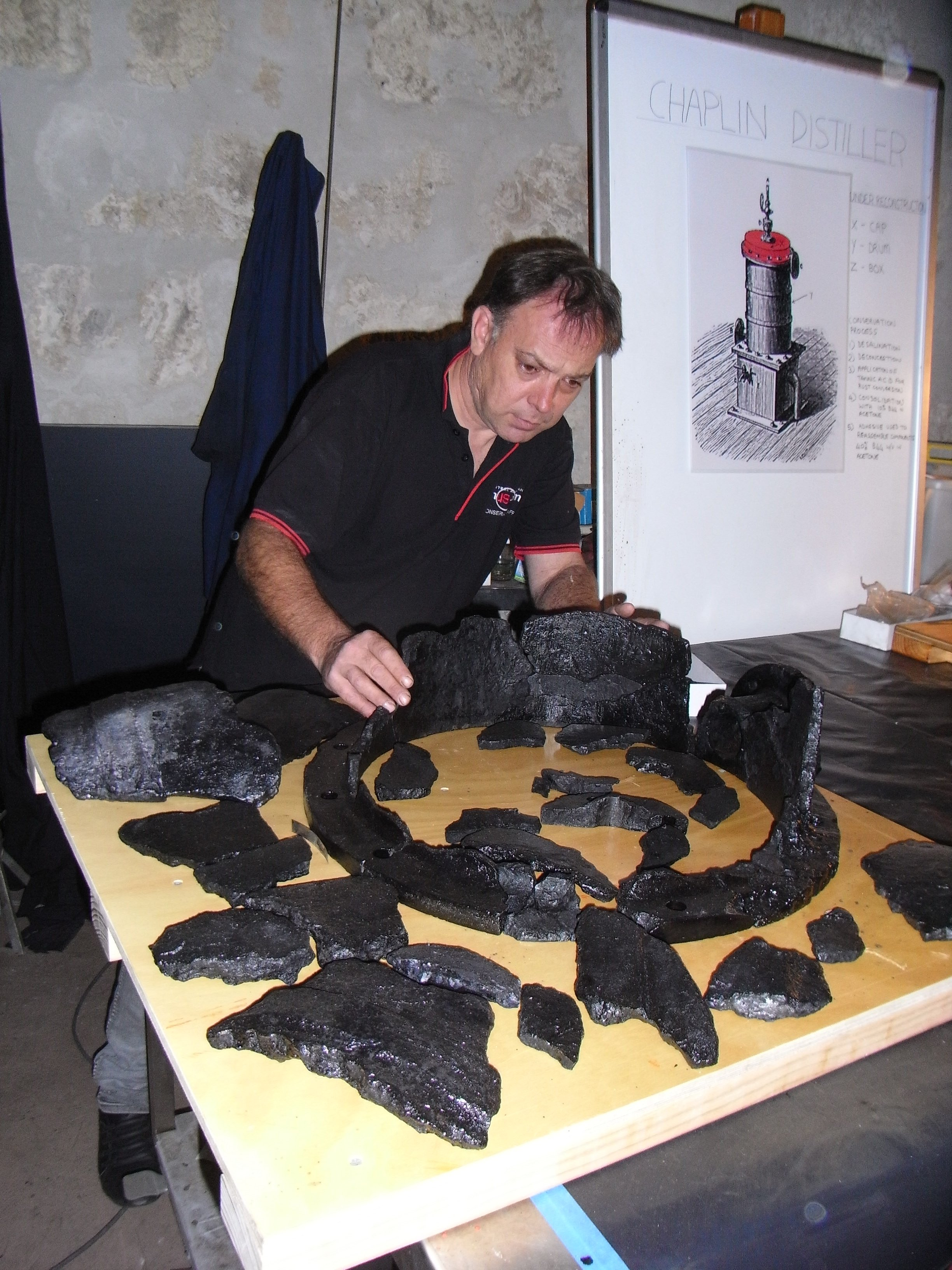
Conservationist reconstructing the Chaplin distiller from SS Xantho shipwreck

The conservation and restoration of shipwreck artifacts is the process of caring for cultural heritage that has been part of a shipwreck. Oftentimes these cultural artifacts have been underwater for a great length of time. Without conservation, most artifacts would perish and important historical data would be lost. In archaeological terms, it is usually the responsibility of an archaeologist and conservator to ensure that material recovered from a shipwreck is properly cared for. The conservation phase is often time-consuming and expensive (sometimes costing more than the original excavation), which is one of the most important considerations when planning and implementing any action involving the recovery of artifacts from a shipwreck.

== Background ==
Underwater shipwreck sites are in either Freshwater or saltwater environments. It is important to distinguish that both environments react differently in relation to the shipwreck and the artifacts it contains. This can refer to the chemical reactions or corrosion that takes place, the rate of deterioration and decay, and the ultimate preservation of the shipwreck artifacts. When shipwrecks are in freshwater environments, they tend to be in a better state of preservation due to the lack of salinity in the water, and overall, have a lower degree of degradation compared to saltwater environments. However, in freshwater environments various bacteria can be a major threat to shipwrecks as it is known for causing the rotting and molding of wooden ships.

Artifacts recovered from a saltwater environment are saturated with salt that must be removed when the artifacts are recovered. With saltwater environments, a phenomenon called concretion occurs. "Concretion occurs when a mixture of iron corrosion product, sand, and sea life forms a hard shell around corroding iron artifacts and can encompass other non-iron artifacts that may be nearby". Although they are often naturally preserved, they are also fragile and friable. Once these artifacts are exposed to air and light they will degrade rapidly, a concern which highlights the importance of timely conservation efforts. Material type is a key factor in determining proper conservation treatment methods. Organic material, such as wood, leather, and textiles, can deteriorate and crumble in a matter of hours if allowed to dry without appropriate treatment. Other materials, such as bone, glass, and pottery, if not conserved, will slowly devitrify and in extreme cases will degenerate into a pile of slivers.

== Agents of deterioration ==
A cannon that has not undergone electrolysis to remove salts after being submerged in water

Agents of deterioration consist of several types of forces that can drastically affect and cause artifacts to deteriorate. To protect an artifact from deterioration and destruction, conservators must use conservation and preservation methods to alleviate the potential risks to the artifact. The amount of damage caused by agents of deterioration can range from minor abrasion to the complete destruction of the artifact. There are ten agents of deterioration: physical force; thieves and vandals; fire; water; pests; pollutants; light, ultraviolet, infrared; incorrect temperature; incorrect relative humidity; and dissociation.

=== Physical force ===
When it comes to the conservation, preservation and the restoration of shipwreck artifacts, physical force is a major concern. Agents of physical force are consistently present throughout the entire processes of conserving and preserving shipwreck artifacts. The retrieval of shipwreck artifacts from the seabed is an extremely intricate and fragile process. Artifacts are extremely delicate, and any slight motion or improper physical contact can cause irreputable damage. When the artifact is brought to the surface through the use of floatation devices, the placement and stabilization of the artifact is of the utmost importance. This is done to ensure the artifacts are well protected from any potential damage caused by the water and/or equipment. Additionally, the handling, movement and transportation of the artifact poses additional risks of contact through physical force. It is paramount that the conservator ensure precautions and appropriate measures are put in place to protect every artifact in each stage of movement and/or relocation.

=== Thieves and vandals ===
As with all archaeological sites, thieves and vandals will always be a primary concern. As scuba diving grows in popularity and treasure hunters seek to make their fortunes, shipwrecks have become constant locations for looting and illegal salvaging. To combat the looting of shipwrecks the United States legislation passed the Abandoned Shipwrecks Act. The act's primary function is to safeguard shipwrecks, located in American waters, from unsanctioned salvaging, illicit looting, and total ruination. This is achieved by affording protection to the shipwreck through granting ownership of it to the state whose waters in which the wreck resides.

=== Fire ===
Once shipwreck artifacts are brought to the surface, they become extremely vulnerable to fire. This is especially true for shipwreck artifacts that are composed of organic materials such as textiles, leather, and wood.

=== Water ===
Although most shipwreck artifacts reside in water, water can be a significant problem that must be addressed. Water has a major impact on artifacts that have been submerged for prolonged periods of time. If organic materials, are removed too quickly and allowed to completely dry out without proper treatment, the artifacts will rapidly disintegrate. It is imperative that artifacts remain in water until the appropriate conservation and preservation techniques have been applied to them, ensuring they are protected, stabilized, and acclimated to their new environmental surroundings.

=== Pests ===
Pests can be found both on dry land and underwater. It is no surprise that shipwrecks are extremely susceptible to both types, as they can cause extensive damage to the wrecks and their surrounding artifacts. An example of an underwater pest can be found in the shipwreck of the Titanic, where a newly identified microbe has been found within the "rusticles, the porous and delicate icicle-like structures that form on rusting iron ... actually feeding off the rusting metal". As these microbes continue eating the rusting metal, the shipwreck of the Titanic will soon be no more. Another underwater pest that can devour shipwrecks are wood eating shipworms. These small creatures can chew through wooden shipwrecks at a rapid pace, and if left unchecked can-do extensive damage to wrecks. Moreover, surface pests such as rodents, insects, and mold can cause even more devastation to shipwreck artifacts that have not been safely stored or tended to. Conservators must be aware of what pests a shipwreck and its artifacts could be introduced too and plan accordingly.

=== Pollutants ===
Pollutants can refer to chemical reactions, air quality, and corrosion. As artifacts go through the various conservation techniques to protect and preserve them, conservators must be cognizant and monitor these artifacts consistently to ensure no further degradation takes place that could be due to unwanted chemical reactions or pollutants in the air. Conservators must also be highly aware of the chemical reactions that have already occurred to the artifacts being recovered such as concretion and metal oxidation.

=== Light ===
When shipwreck artifacts are recovered it is important for conservators to evaluate how to create an appropriate environment with the correct light exposure. This is impeccably important for waterlogged wood and other organic materials as the direct presence of ultraviolet light/infrared radiation can cause degradation and eventual disintegration. The best practice is to keep shipwreck artifacts in a cooler storage environment with minimal access to light, which can cause unwanted heating and fluctuations in temperature, leading to extremely harmful results.

=== Temperature ===
Like other historical and cultural artifacts, incorrect temperatures can have a devastating effect on shipwreck artifacts, particularly wood. Drastic temperature changes can cause irreversible damage to artifacts such as: warping, crumbling, or fragmenting. Higher temperatures, specifically, could result in humidity levels significantly rising which could cause further deterioration, infestations of insects, molds, rot, and bacteria.

=== Relative humidity ===
As discussed previously, high relative humidity may result in mold, infestations, rot and even undesirable chemical reactions or corrosion, depending on environmental conditions. Incorrect relative humidity can cause biological deterioration of shipwreck artifacts, resulting in cracking, crumbling, or complete disintegration of the artifacts, especially organic materials. Even metal artifacts need to be protected from the corroding effects caused by a higher relative humidity.

=== Dissociation ===
It is important to ensure that records for shipwreck artifacts are accurate and detailed. Without accurate documentation an artifact could be mislabeled and associated with an incorrect wreck site. This is vital for shipwreck discoveries as they can become points of contention in international legal battles over ownership. Furthermore, shipwreck artifacts removed without care and at random are subjected to become dissociated and lose their provenience. This dissociation causes a great loss of information about the artifact and its relevance to the shipwreck.

== Basic conservation of shipwreck artifacts by material type ==
=== Bone and ivory ===
Approximately 70% of bone and ivory is made up of an inorganic lattice composed of calcium phosphate and various carbonates and fluorides, and at least 30% is ossein, which is organic. It is difficult to distinguish them unless examined microscopically. Both bone and ivory are easily warped by heat and moisture, and deteriorate by prolonged exposure to water.

==== Removal of soluble salts ====
Bone and ivory being at a saltwater environment will absorb soluble salts and crystallizes when removed from water as the object drys. The salt crystallization will make the surface flake and can destroy the object. In some cases when bone and ivory suffer ossein loss due to hydrolysis, it leaves the calcareous substance; the calcareous substance can cause the materials to fossilise and once organic content is lost resulting in crystallisation, quartz can be formed. The soluble salt must be removed to preserve and stabilize the object when removed from the marine environment. Artifacts of these types of material are recommended to remove all the soluble salts with the use of water.

==== Removal of stains ====
It is recommended to use mechanical methods over chemical treatments, if chemical treatment is inevitable always make sure that the material is thoroughly wetted with water before any chemical is applied. If the object has iron stains, oxalic acid is used to remove it. Is the object has sulfide stains, oxalic acid is used.

==== Impregnation and drying ====
To dry bone and ivory it requires a series of alcohol baths. Bone is a material prone to cracks and splits during the dehydration process. If the bone has been established as weak and unstable, and that dehydration can cause cracks and splits to the bone structure, the bone is impregnated prior drying with the use of 50% solution of polyvinyl acetate (PVA(C_{4}H_{6}O_{2})_{n}) in distilled water. For ivory it is sometimes necessary to go through longer dehydration baths to insure that the surface of the treated material does not delaminate or crack.

=== Glass ===
Glass is made from silica and a variety of other components that gives the glass color. Glass, usually, is also referred to the most stable of archaeological materials, but glass artifacts, and glass from the 17th century can go through complex disintegration. Normally glass consists of 70% to 74% silica, 16% to 22% alkali and 5% to 10% of flux. The other components and mineral compounds from glass can leach out over time, causing iridescent rainbow patterns and flaking of the outer surface of glass

==== Conservation ====
Determining the selection of materials and treatment for the glass depends on the level of preservation of the glass. To remove surface corrosion must be made case-by-case bases. The removal of corrosion over the glass surface may significantly reduce the thickness of the walls and weaken it significantly. The removal of surface corrosion can also make the surface blur and/or alter surface details. The corrosion layers on the glass may be part of the object's history and should not be removed without good reasons.

==== Cleaning ====
When determined to be cleaned, highly damaged glass, the priority is to consolidate the material, and then undertake cleaning. Deposits can be removed with a soft brush, scalpel, and/or cotton swabs soaked in solvents while the glass object is wet. Painted colors and decorations on the glass surface must be protected with a coating of consolidant. Deposits of metal oxides can also be removed by mechanical or controlled use of chemicals; however, metal oxides are often firmly bonded on the glass surface and sometimes its better not to be removed. Calcareous deposits on the glass surface can represent a significant problem; for cleaning it is recommended to use a scalpel while the object is still wet.

===== Removal of soluble salts =====
When glass is removed from a marine environment it must past through a process called desalination. Desalination is the process to remove soluble salts. The glass can be submerged on tap water baths and distilled water, exchanging the water regularly. Once the process is completed with the removal of soluble salt, the object can be air-dried or undergo consolidation.

==== Bonding ====
When glass is fragmented it should be bonded the secure the object's stability and aesthetic integrity. The adhesives used to glue glass fragments must be transparent, reversible and with good adhesion, and must not damage the glass. Paraloid B72 acrylic resin and the Araldite 2020 epoxy resin are preferred for its greater duration. The glass fragments must be cleaned and initially joined with adhesive tape or metal omega clips before the use of the adhesive.

=== Leather ===
Leather is a porous material made from the skin of an animal. Being in a marine environment leather can deteriorate over time. The water-soluble material such as tannins, fats and oils, components part of leather, can dissolve in a marine environment as a result of the collagen's fiber that is susceptible to hydrolysis.

==== Cleaning ====
Leather must be washed to remove any ingrained dirt; Its ideal to wash leather with water alone. Depending on the condition of the leather, there are variety of mechanical cleaning techniques that may be used and required. Materials such as soft brushes, water jets, ultrasonic cleaners, and ultrasonic dental tools are effective cleaning tools for leather. When leather is mechanically cleaned with a soft steam of water, soft brushed and sponges can also be used. In the case of consistent impurities, leather can be cleaned by chemical means, with the use of small amounts of non-ionic detergents. The chemical cleaning must be followed with a rinse under a stream of water.

===== Removal of soluble salts =====
It is necessary to remove soluble salts in leather when removed from a marine environment. The removal of soluble salts (desalination) on leather is done with tap water over an extended period of time.

=== Metal ===
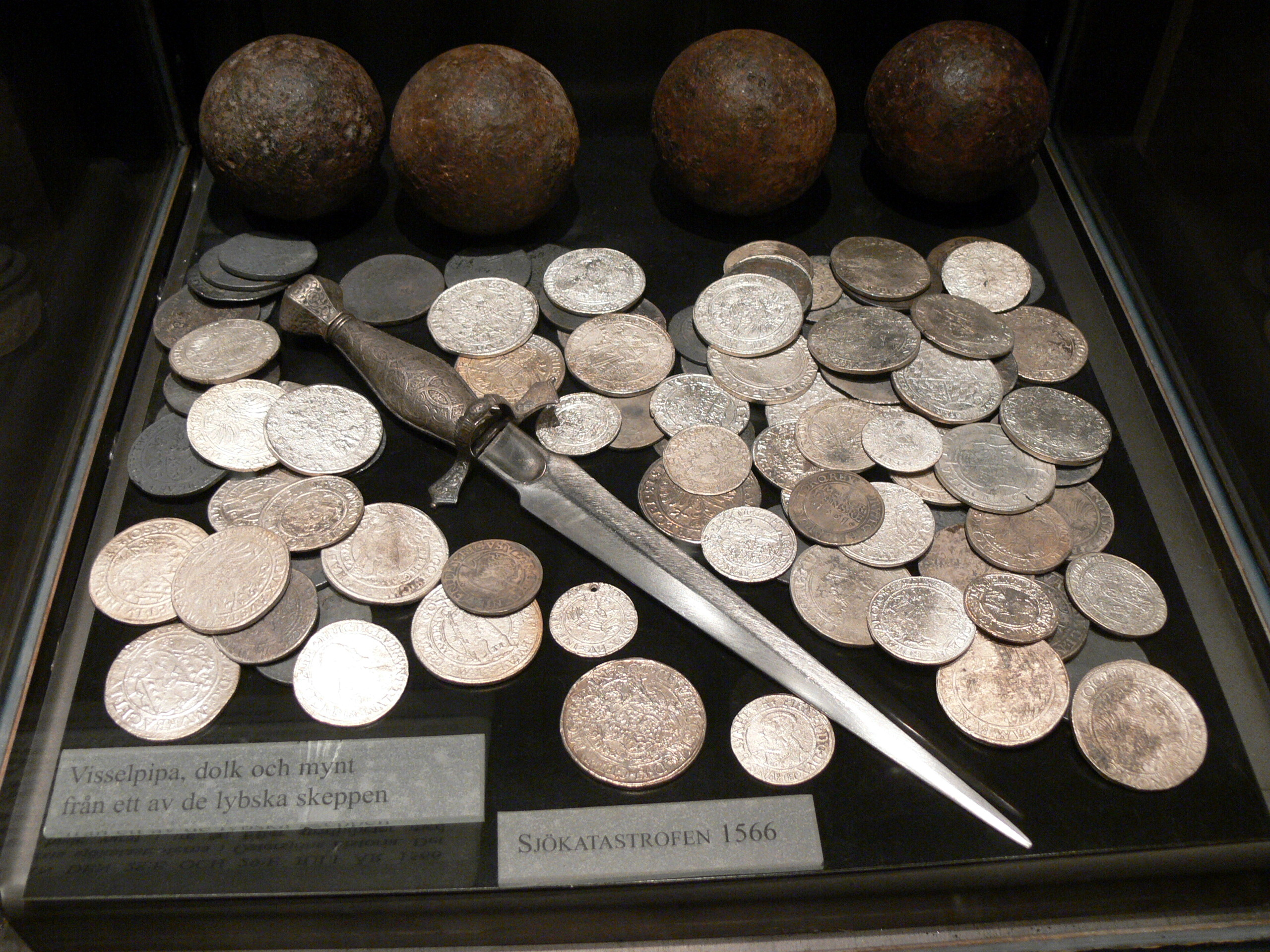
Astrolabes, coins, and other objects recovered from the Padre Island shipwrecks

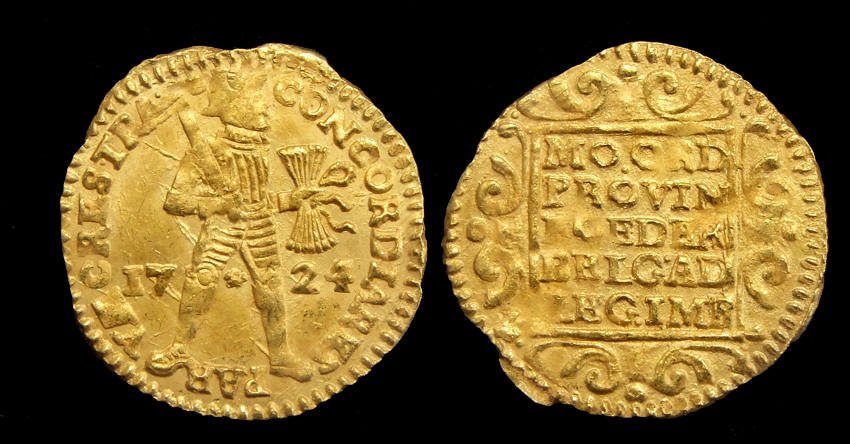
Gold Ducat (1724) from the Dutch East India Company (VOC) shipwreck de Akerendam

Metal is a solid material that is hard, opaque, and shiny, with a good electrical and thermal conductivity. Metals are also malleable, this allows for metals to be hammered and formed out of shape without breaking or cracking.

==== Conservation ====
The conservation of metal artifacts greatly depends on the damage and corrosion they have, the overall state of the object. Before conservation techniques are applied to a metal artifact, it is essential to be aware of the corrosion products that result from the exposure to different environments. The nature of the corrosion determines, including the understanding of the characteristics of the metal of which an object is made, will also determine the techniques and selection of materials that can be effectively used. The corrosion of metals is a spontaneous process of unintentional destruction caused by physical, chemical and/or biological agents. Most metals that are in an underwater environment will corrode to a certain extent until they reach an equilibrium with their surrounding environment. Once the metal objects become stable they can survive for some time underwater unless their environment changes

Pure gold will usually survive underwater for a long period of time without corroding. With silver objects, it will corrode quite easily, become very fragile, and form layers of concretion. Copper, brass and bronze can develop a shiny pitted surface and can become covered with a layer of concretion as well as green or black corrosion. Ferrous metals such as cast and wrought iron and steel usually corrode to form thick concretions that can entirely cover the metal object. Corroded shipwreck artifacts that are made of iron may be conserved via electrolysis. Electrolysis is a method that uses an electric current to create a chemical reaction that cleans the object and treats rust. Marine organisms such as limpets and molluscs can grasp on the metal surfaces and cause fouling corrosion—corrosion.

==== Cleaning ====
The cleaning process of metals depends on the level of corrosion, oxides, and/or marine organism (limpets, molluscs, calcareous, etc.) accumulation on the metal's surface. There are several methods such as sandblasting and electrolytic reduction, including other methods done mechanically and chemically.

=== Ceramic and stone ===
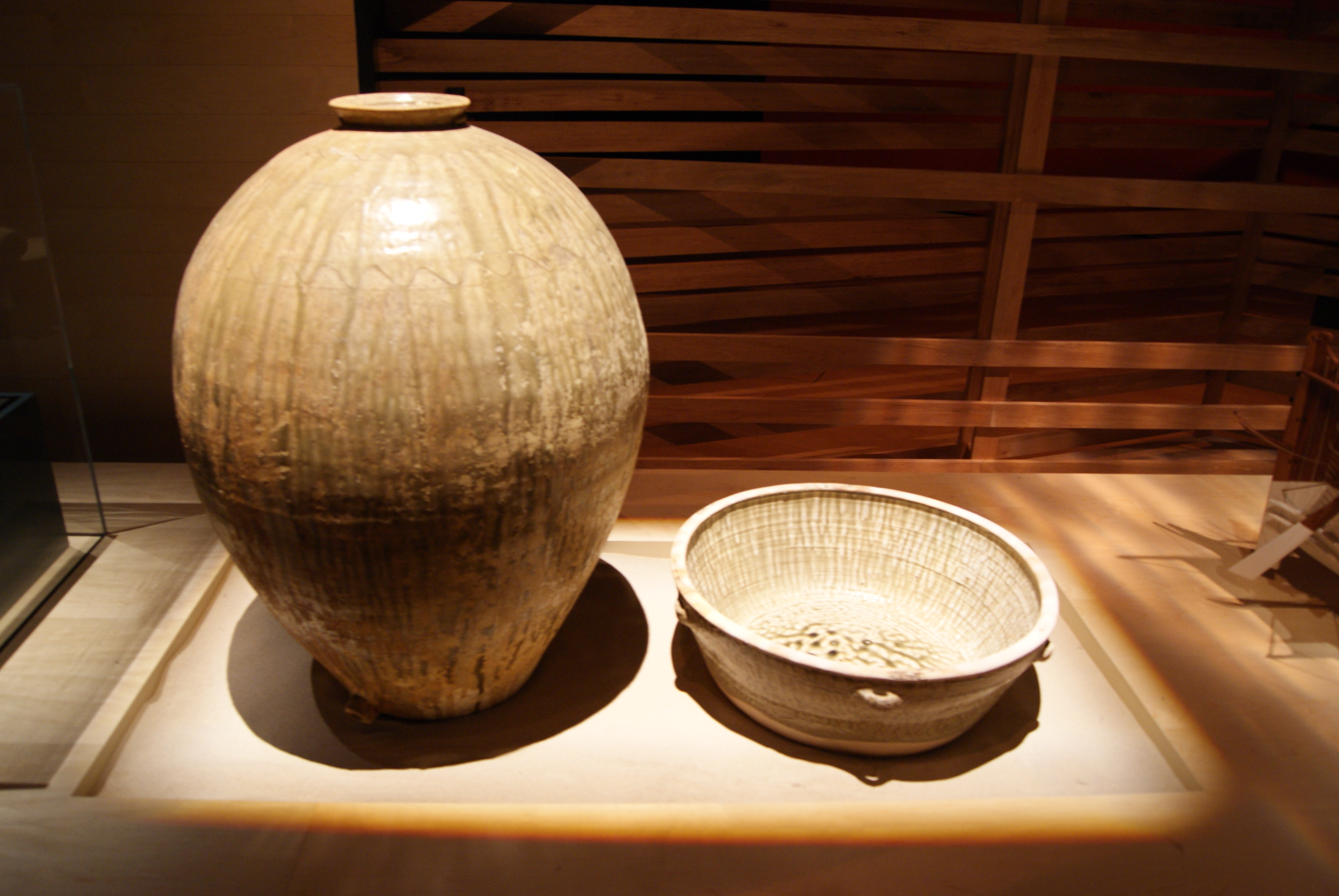
Stoneware recovered from the Belitung shipwreck

Ceramics are made from clay and hardened by heat. Ceramics can also be coated with a protective coating to ensure impermeability. Clay is formed by the alteration of feldspathic rocks under the influence of atmospheric agents, such as rain, rivers, winds and gas releases from the Earth's crust.

There are three types of rock differentiated by physical characteristics resulting from their respective formative processes. These three categories are: igneous or volcanic rocks (basalt, granite, etc.), sedimentary or deposit rocks (limestone, sandstone, arenite, etc.), and metamorphic rocks (marble, slate, gypsum, etc.). Igneous rocks are formed by the cooling and/or solidification of magma and the formation of a dense network of crystals—below the Earth's surface as intrusive rock or on the surface as effusive rock. Sedimentary rocks are formed by the deposition of the remains of other rock caused by the action of atmospheric influences. Metamorphic rocks are formed by the transformation of existing rock through the action of temperature and pressure, which cause profound physical and/or chemical changes.

==== Conservation ====
The conservation of ceramics and stones depends on the object's preservation, the environment where the objects were recovered and the type and quantity of depositions. Any type of conservation intervention and treatment must be minimal to ensure no damage to the objects or leave any trace, causing it stress.

==== Cleaning ====
The cleaning of ceramics and stones is done mechanically or chemically. This also depends on the types of accumulation from the marine environment, the state of conservation and the materials of which the object is made. When ceramics and stones are extracted from the sea they may have calcareous and siliceous deposits of marine organisms, deposits and/or infiltration of iron and copper oxides, and organic deposits (algae, bacteria, sponges, etc.).

===== Removal of soluble salts =====
The removal of soluble salts, desalination, of ceramics and stones is carried out by submerging the objects in clean water that is periodically changed. Tap water is used first as part of the desalination process, followed by distilled water in subsequent baths. It is crucial to proceed gradually in order to avoid the overly rapid release of salts that could cause additional damage to the object.

===== Removal of calcareous and siliceous deposits =====
The calcareous and siliceous deposits, though difficult to remove as they are fused on the object's surface, can be mechanically removed using surgical scalpels, ultrasonic chisels and pins, pneumatic chisels, pressurized water jets and by other means, since siliceous bonds are very resistant to chemicals and do not react to mild acids and bases. If calcareous deposits cannot be removed mechanically, chemicals are used. Cleaning with chemical compounds must be controlled, and mild substances must be used that cannot damage the physical and chemical structure of the object.

===== Removal of iron and copper oxides =====
Iron and copper oxide stains occur when oxidized metals are located near or in contact with a ceramic or stone object and metal oxide particles pass to the structure of the stone or ceramic. Iron and copper oxides can penetrate deep into the pores of ceramics and stones and create reddish-brown to black stains (iron oxide) and blue-green stains (copper oxides). The use of EDTA salt solution can be used to remove the oxides. A mild solution consists of 3% to 5% of EDTA; 15% to 20% solution in water on ceramics to remove the stains. Iron oxides can be removed from the objects by the use of water in a 10% to 25% solution of hydrogen peroxide. The time required to remove the stains can vary from a few seconds to several hours.

==== Bonding ====
When objects are found in a fragmented state, the fragments are bonded with adhesives to achieve stability and the integrity of the object. Before bonding the fragments are held with paper adhesive tape in the exact position to join them prior to final gluing. Objects with sensitive surfaces such as glazing and painted decorations on stones and ceramics should be specially protected to avoid breaking off and/or tearing of the surface with paper adhesive tape. Once the fragments are precisely located they are bonded together with adhesives. The use of strong adhesives should be used to glue large ceramics and most stones.

==== Ceramic and stone deterioration ====
Degradation and alteration are natural processes in the lifetime of every material. The process is constant and unstoppable, though conservators and restorers can undertake a series of treatments on objects to attempt to slow the process of degradation. The degradation of materials usually happens when objects are removed from the environment in which they were located and had achieved a state of equilibrium, even if the environment is imperfect, and the objects are moved to another environment. Alteration refers to the aging of objects accompanied by changes that do not directly affect their preservation and that do not impair their readability. This category of change includes alterations of color, the formation of a superficial patina on objects and so forth.

=== Textile ===
Textiles are fabrics and woven objects that are products of other kinds of interlacing of yarns, braiding, looping, knitting, lace making, and netting. The textile category also includes materials such as felts and non-woven materials in which the fibers gain coherence by a process other than spinning. The most encountered textile materials in archeological sites are linen, cotton, wool and silk.

==== Conservation ====
Textile conservation is limited to the following types of textiles: the natural fibers of animal and plants. Textile can be made of wool, hair, silk, cotton, flax, jute, hemp, nettle, among others. Textiles that are made with the fibers of animals are primarily composed of protein, making it more resistant to decompose, compared to plant fibers that are primarily composed with cellulose. Light, insects, micro-organisms and pollution can cause textiles to deteriorate; making it lose strength and pliability. The normal exposure of the atmospheric conditions can cause textiles to weaken and disintegrate

The conservation of textiles should always be left to a specialist conservator. Before any conservation treatment the composition of the textile must be identified. Testing textiles such as burning a sample can quickly identify the presence of animal fiber, animal fiber will not burn readily and shrivel into a carbon residue. Plant fibers burn easily to a fine ash. Overall simple testings can enable the conservator to identify the type of textile fiber. The proper treatment of textiles requires the use of flat, shallow pans, hot plates, and racks, or other devices that can support fragile textiles during rinsing, treatment, and drying.

==== Cleaning (removes soil, discoloration and stains) ====
Textiles can be cleaned with water, numerable substances can be removed by using water (de-ionized water preferred). For better results add mixture of 0.4% to 1% ammonium hydroxide to the water. If necessary, of neutral non-ionic detergent to remove stubborn soil. During the cleaning process bleach can be added in a 4% hydrogen peroxide solution. For stubborn stains such as mold, mildew, black sulfide stains, and organic stains, the fabric is soaked in a solution of 1 liter of de-ionized water, 60 ml 30% hydrogen peroxide and a 2.5 g sodium silicate dissolved in 100 ml hot de-ionized water. Be aware that the latter solutions are damaging to the fibres, they may reduce the visible staining, but this is through a bleaching action that also deteriorate fibres and will make them more brittle over time.

For textiles that cannot be cleaned with water (such as textiles with water-soluble dyes), dry cleaning using organic solvents, such as perchlorethylene or trichlorethylene, or petroleum solvents, such as white spirits, is recommended.

==== Sterilization ====
For textiles infested with mold (including insects), the infested textiles must be closed in a container with thymol crystals. After treatment with thymol crystals, a solution of 0.5% to 1% of Lysol is used. Other disinfection solution composed of 0.1% of dowicide 1 (ortho-phenylphenol), 68% of ethanol, and 30% of de-ionized water; the solution will be lethal to most bacteria, fungal spores, and surface mildews.

=== Wood ===
Wood, an organic material produced by plants, are chemically composed of: carbohydrates (cellulose and hemicellulose), lignin and other components (aliphatic acids, alcohols, proteins and inorganic substances) in a smaller amount. The most important composition of the plant is the cellulose. The cellulose accounts the majority of the cell from 40% to 50% of the wood's total mass. Hemicellulose represents the second most important carbohydrate with accounts 20% to 30% of the wood's cell.

==== Conservation ====
Wood recovered from a marine environment is referred to archaeological waterlogged wood. Waterlogged wood is defined as wood that does not contain or contains a small amount of air within its cells (capillaries and micro-capillaries). Archaeological Waterlogged normally looks well preserved; however, it is very weak and deteriorates because of the soluble water substance making it dissolve in marine environments. The cellulose of the wood goes through the process of hydrolysis and attacked by anaerobic bacteria that decompose the wood, leaving it only with the lignin network. Over an extended period of time the lignin network will also decompose. The result of the decomposition of cellulose and lignin will increase in the space between cells and the molecules within cells, this will render the wood to a more porous and permeable to water. All of the wood's cavities will be filled with water, and the absorbed water and the remnants of the lignin will maintain the original form of the woods, meaning that the wood will only retain its original form while its underwater. When wood is found in a marine environment, it is recommended to have secured the required conditions for its conservation (water-filled pool or vessel) to extract the wood from water, to prevent the wood from dehydration. If the waterlogged wood is removed from the marine environment and exposed to air, the water will evaporate and the resulting surface tension forces of the evaporating water cause the weakened cell walls to collapse, creating considerable shrinkage and distortion

==== Cleaning ====
Waterlogged woods extracted from a marine environment may be covered by impurities and sediments. These accumulations can be removed with water, with the use of soft brushed and increased temperature to 30 °C (86 °F) to remove tougher incrustations. The calcareous shells from the marine environment can be a frequent component of accumulations on the surface of waterlogged wood. The calcareous can be removed mechanically using scalpels of various profiles and sizes. Iron can also be present on the waterlogged wood. The accumulation of iron can be removed by treating the wood with a 5% solution of disodium salt of ethylenediaminetetraacetic acid in water.

===== Removal of soluble salts =====
The removal of soluble salts, desalination, of wood extracted from a marine environment is crucial. Desalination is done with clean water, with disinfectant added to prevent the development of harmful organisms. The disinfectant fungicide, algaecide, orthophenyl phenol; however, the most commonly used and recommended because of its lesser toxicity is a mixture of boric acid and borax. The desalination process takes a long period of time and is necessary that the water is changed until the concentration of excreted of soluble salts reach its maximum.

==== Impregnation ====
The conservation of waterlogged wood is a complex process that involves impregnating. The impregnation process involves replacing the water with a material that will strengthen the structure of the wood without causing the wood to contract or come apart. There are different methods used to impregnate wood:

1. Polyethylene glycol (PEG) method
2. Sucrose method
3. Acetone-rosin method
4. Alcohol-ether method
5. Camphor-alcohol method

== Modern practices ==
=== Photogrammetry ===
Photogrammetry is increasingly being used in maritime archaeology to create digital 3D maps and models. "Photogrammetry is the process of collecting a series of still images or videos of an object, such as a shipwreck, and then loading those images into software that can triangulate the photographed points to create a 3D model." "Underwater photogrammetry is a good alternative to traditional archaeological excavations, which are often less accurate and very destructive to underwater artifacts, furthermore the photogrammetric principles applied with the Remotely Operated Vehicles allows us to explore objects that are at very great depths."

=== 3D modeling ===
3D modeling of cultural heritage, including shipwreck artifacts, can be created and used for research without the need for physical access. 3D models made using photogrammetry techniques were created for shipwreck artifacts of the Mary Rose.

== Shipwreck ==
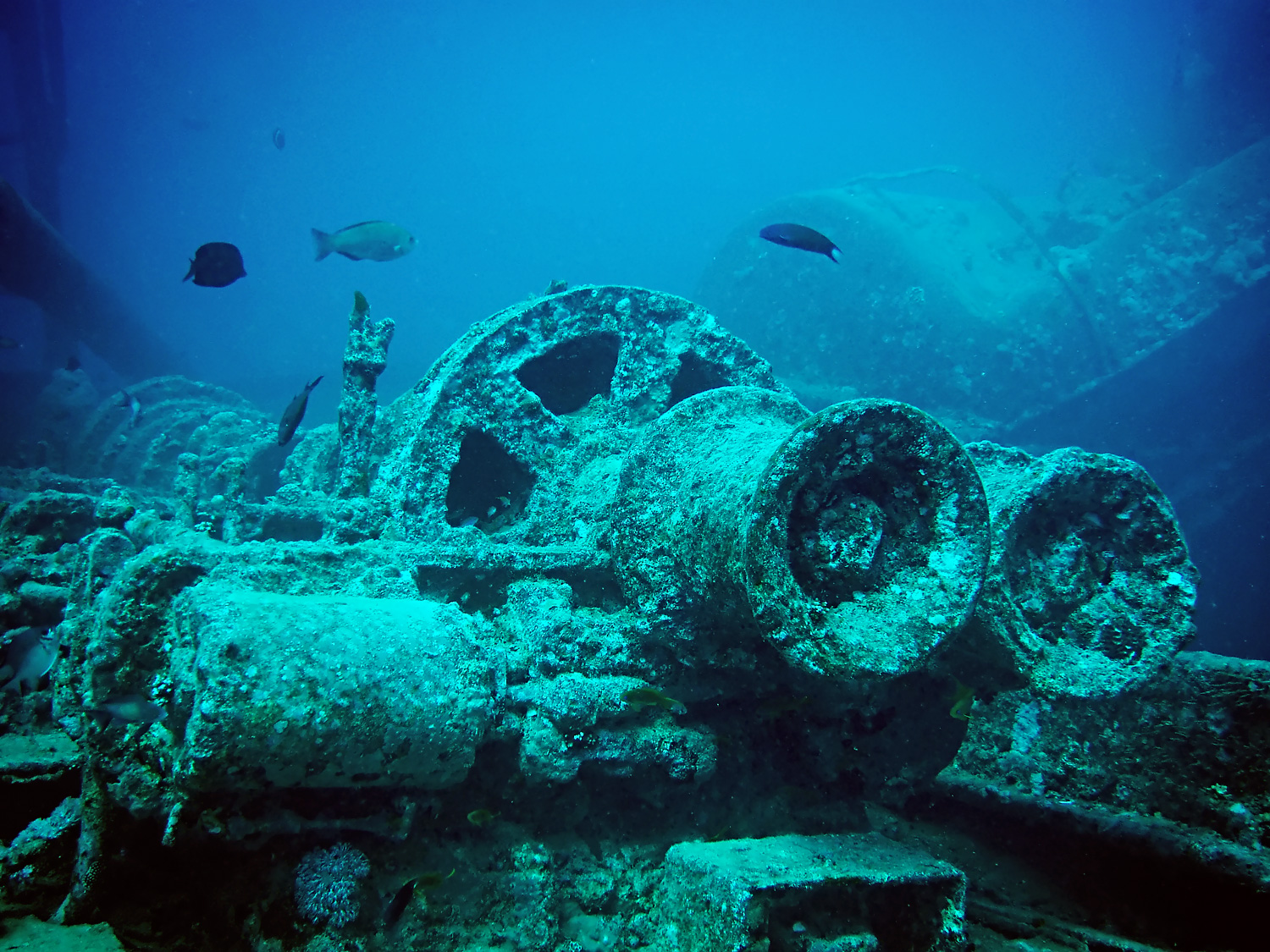
The Thistlegorm, a transport ship, was sunk by a German bomber, during the Second World War.

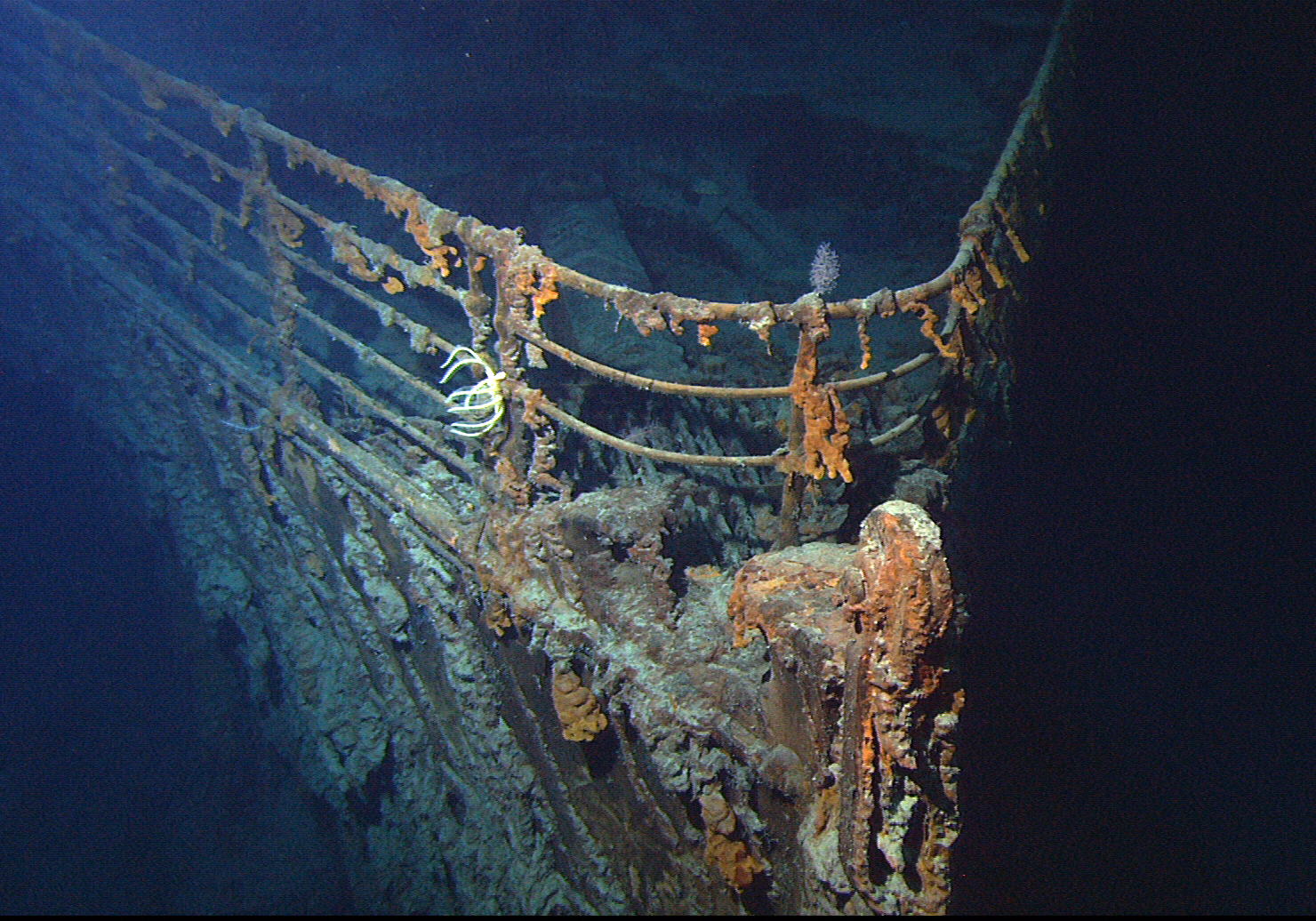
View of the bow of the Titanic

A shipwreck is the remains of a ship that has been wrecked, found either on land, beached, or sunken at the bottom of the sea. The United Nations Educational, Scientific and Cultural Organization estimated that over 3 million shipwrecks are spread across the ocean floors. Shipwrecks do not only occur in the oceans, they are common on inland waterways as well. "There are over 6,000 shipwrecks in the Great Lakes, having caused an estimated loss of 30,000 mariners' lives." Many artifacts can be found through shipwrecks including gold, jewelry, spears, swords, ceremonial axes and hundreds of other objects. Shipwreck artifacts can be used to tell meaningful stories that go far beyond the interpretation of the vessel. Maritime history topics include military actions, piracy, whaling, slavery, immigration, Native American maritime, art, engineering, navigation, and many more. "There is a sense of urgency to capture previous eras and cultures, and a sense of the people, vessels, and their trade."

=== Causes of shipwreck ===
Many factors will contribute to the causes of a shipwreck: poor design and construction, instability, navigation error, warfare, or overloading, among other factors. Other causes of shipwrecks are related to nature, such as atmospheric (tropical storm, hurricane, rain, etc.), climatic (iceberg), oceanic (current, tide, reef, etc.), or tectonic (earthquake, volcano, tsunami, etc.). Scuttling, the deliberate sinking of a ship, is another cause of shipwrecks.

== Maritime archaeology ==
The study of shipwrecks and other underwater artifacts is a discipline known as maritime archeology. Maritime Archaeology is a sub-discipline of the field of archaeology. This discipline studies the history and cultural material related to human interaction on, under, near or associated with the sea. From the study of ships and shipwrecks, maritime infrastructure, maritime exploitation, maritime identities and landscapes, seascapes, and other types of heritage, both tangible and intangible. There are other sub-disciplines like nautical and underwater archaeology but these are more concerned with smaller, more specific areas of the discipline. For example, Nautical Archaeology is primarily focused on the "ship", including its technical and social aspects, whether the ship is on land, underwater or in a museum. Underwater Archeology focus on the archaeological sites located underwater, regardless of their connection to the sea; it includes shipwreck sites, aircraft wrecks, sunken cities, submerged Indigenous habitation sites, among others.

=== Provenience of Shipwreck Artifacts ===
When a shipwreck is discovered, it is imperative that the shipwreck is extensively mapped out, gridded, and artifact placement is recorded to ensure the most accurately detailed record of provenance/provenience possible. Provenance/Provenience is paramount if the marine archaeologists want to understand the wreckage and its relevance to history and human culture. Without proper provenience procedures a vast amount of research data about the site could be inevitably lost. This is exceptionally important when it comes to identifying a shipwreck by its location, historical connections of artifacts, and when attempting to confirm rightful ownership. The United Nations Educational, Scientific and Cultural Organization (UNESCO) established, in 2001, the UNESCO Convention on the Protection of the Underwater Cultural Heritage. This treaty was designed to protect underwater cultural heritage for both educational, scientific, and recreational purposes. The treaty states "Underwater cultural heritage means all traces of human existence having a cultural, historical or archaeological character which have been partially or totally underwater, periodically or continuously, for at least 100 years such as: sites, structure, buildings, artefacts and human remains, together with their archaeological and natural context; vessels, aircraft, or other vehicles or any part thereof, their cargo or other contents, together with their archaeological and natural context; and objects of prehistoric character". This treaty is a global acknowledgment of the importance in conserving and preserving shipwrecks and the artifacts associated with them for present and future generations to study and learn about them.

The history of shipwreck discoveries has been wrought with legal battles between individuals, companies, and countries trying to lay claim to a shipwreck and its associated artifacts. One of the most contentious legal battles over a shipwreck's ownership rights is over the Spanish galleon San José which sunk off the coast of Cartagena, Colombia. Upon its discovery in 2015, the shipwreck and its cargo have a net worth of over $20 billion. However, "despite the San José galleon being found in Colombian waters, there's no guarantee it will stay within its borders. Spain has shown interest in claiming part of the galleon, as has the Bolivian Indigenous nation Qhara Qhara whose land (once part of the Viceroyalty of Peru) the San José's riches were extracted from. Moreover, the San José has been entangled in legal battles for nearly 40 years. American salvage company Sea Search Armada (SSA) stated they'd found the ship in the early 1980s and claimed 50% of its contents". Currently, the legal battle continues over the rightful ownership of the San José shipwreck and its cargo.

Another example of a shipwreck being the center of a legal battle can be seen in the extensive court proceedings concerning the shipwreck of the Spanish frigate the Nuestra Señora de las Mercedes, found off the coast of Portugal. In 2007, Odyssey Marine Exploration, Inc discovered the wreckage of the Mercedes, which contained almost a million coins and other impressive artifacts. The American company ended up salvaging the shipwreck and transported the entire shipwreck's treasure to the United States. This decision to salvage and remove the shipwreck artifacts by Odyssey Marine Exploration, was further questioned and complicated by the location of the wreckage. "When a ship has been discovered, the country where the ship was registered can point to something called sovereign immunity (in addition to claims of ownership). This refers to a specific category of ships that are immune from legal proceedings by another state. Warships and other government ships operated for non-commercial purposes enjoy sovereign immunity". It was in 2012, that a U.S. federal court ruled in favor of Spain in accordance with the international law of sovereign immunity, which forced Odyssey Marine Exploration, Inc to return the haul, in its entirety, to the Spanish government. The ownership battle over the Mercedes shipwreck demonstrates just how complicated and messy legal claims and disputes can become when dealing with shipwrecks and their artifacts.

=== Abandoned Shipwreck Laws ===
As seeking underwater resources and shipwrecks became a more lucrative enterprise in the twentieth century. The United States government sought to create a more established system to determine ownership of specified waters. The Submerged Lands Act of 1953 was a United States federal law that established state's ownership of submerged lands within their jurisdiction, which includes lakes, rivers, and up to three nautical miles from the state's coastline. This early legislation depicting states' ownership of underwater resources contributed to the later Abandoned Shipwrecks Act of 1987, which procured state ownership of shipwrecks within their sanctioned authority. The Abandoned Shipwreck Act of 1987 "establishes government ownership over the majority of abandoned shipwrecks located in waters of the United States of America and creates a framework within which shipwrecks are managed. Enacted in 1988, it affirms the authority of State governments to claim and manage abandoned shipwrecks on State submerged lands. It makes the laws of salvage and finds not apply to any shipwreck covered under the Act and asserts that shipwrecks are multiple-use resources". It is from this act that historical shipwrecks are deemed to be multi-purpose. Shipwrecks not only provide scientific and archaeological data and information, but shipwrecks are also curators for marine ecosystems, recreational scuba diving, and educational resources for the public.

=== Shipwreck Sanctuaries ===
In the more recent decades, the Maritime Heritage Program has become concentrated on the preservation of underwater historical and cultural resources. This has included the creation of marine sanctuaries around specific shipwreck sites. "NOAA's Maritime Heritage Program was started in 2002 to help preserve the many stories of America's history hidden under the sea. Sanctuary and NOAA staff are working with numerous partners to locate, document and preserve dozens of historically significant shipwrecks and artifacts from America's past." These maritime shipwreck sanctuaries such as Thunder Bay Sanctuary and Monterey Bay National Marine Sanctuary are focused on conserving these sunken historical treasures, while working to document the shipwrecks, and educate the public about them.

== Climate change ==
Climate change affects every aspect of life on Earth, and shipwrecks are no different. With global warming worsening, the impact to shipwrecks will worsen as well. As the atmosphere becomes hotter there has been a significant increase in supercharged tropical storms. Due to their immense power, these destructive natural disasters can easily obliterate shipwrecks that are in shallower waters. In the wake of destruction pivotal information about the shipwrecks and their artifacts can be lost for good.

As carbon dioxide increases in the atmosphere, "one-quarter of the carbon dioxide released by burning coal, oil and gas doesn't stay in the air, but instead dissolves into the ocean. Since the beginning of the industrial era, the ocean has absorbed some 525 billion tons of CO_{2} from the atmosphere, presently around 22 million tons per day". This significant increase of carbon dioxide dissolving in the oceans is changing the water's chemistry and PH balance by causing acidification. A higher acid content in the oceans result in a drastic change in the water's mineral composition. One such change caused by the ocean's higher acid content is the dissolving of concretions found on most shipwreck artifacts. As the concretions break up and dissolve, shipwreck artifacts will become exposed and even more susceptible to the high acid content and further destruction.

As climate change has spawned an increase in temperatures sea levels are beginning to rise bringing about drastic depth changes throughout Earth's waters. An example of the implications of depth changes can be seen "In many wrecks around Florida, for instance, seagrass functions as an anchor, holding sediment in place and blanketing fragile timbers. Some of these species vanish below about 30 feet; anything deeper is too cold, too dark, and too devoid of oxygen. A sea-level rise of just a few meters could theoretically swamp these wrecks with enough water to threaten the survival of the species that lock them in place". Shipwrecks have stabilized to the environment and the ecosystem that they have been subjected to. However, these shipwrecks are likely too fragile to restabilize in a new underwater environment and will be destroyed as time progresses.

Finally, a new threat to shipwrecks caused by the warming of Earth's waters is the migration and invasion of the wood eating ship worm to new ecosystems. An example can be seen in the Baltic Sea: "The sea's cool, brackish waters have for centuries protected the wrecks from the wormlike mollusks. But now global warming is making the Baltic Sea more comfortable for the critters". This migration of pests threatens all the significant shipwrecks located in the Baltic Sea. "Shipworms, which can obliterate a wreck in ten years, have already attacked about a hundred vessels dating back to the 13th century in Baltic waters off Germany, Denmark, and Sweden".

== See also ==
- List of shipwrecks
- Archaeology of shipwrecks
