= St Grada and Holy Cross Church, Grade =

Coordinates: 49°59′5.94″N 5°11′34.08″W

St Grada & Holy Cross Church, Grade
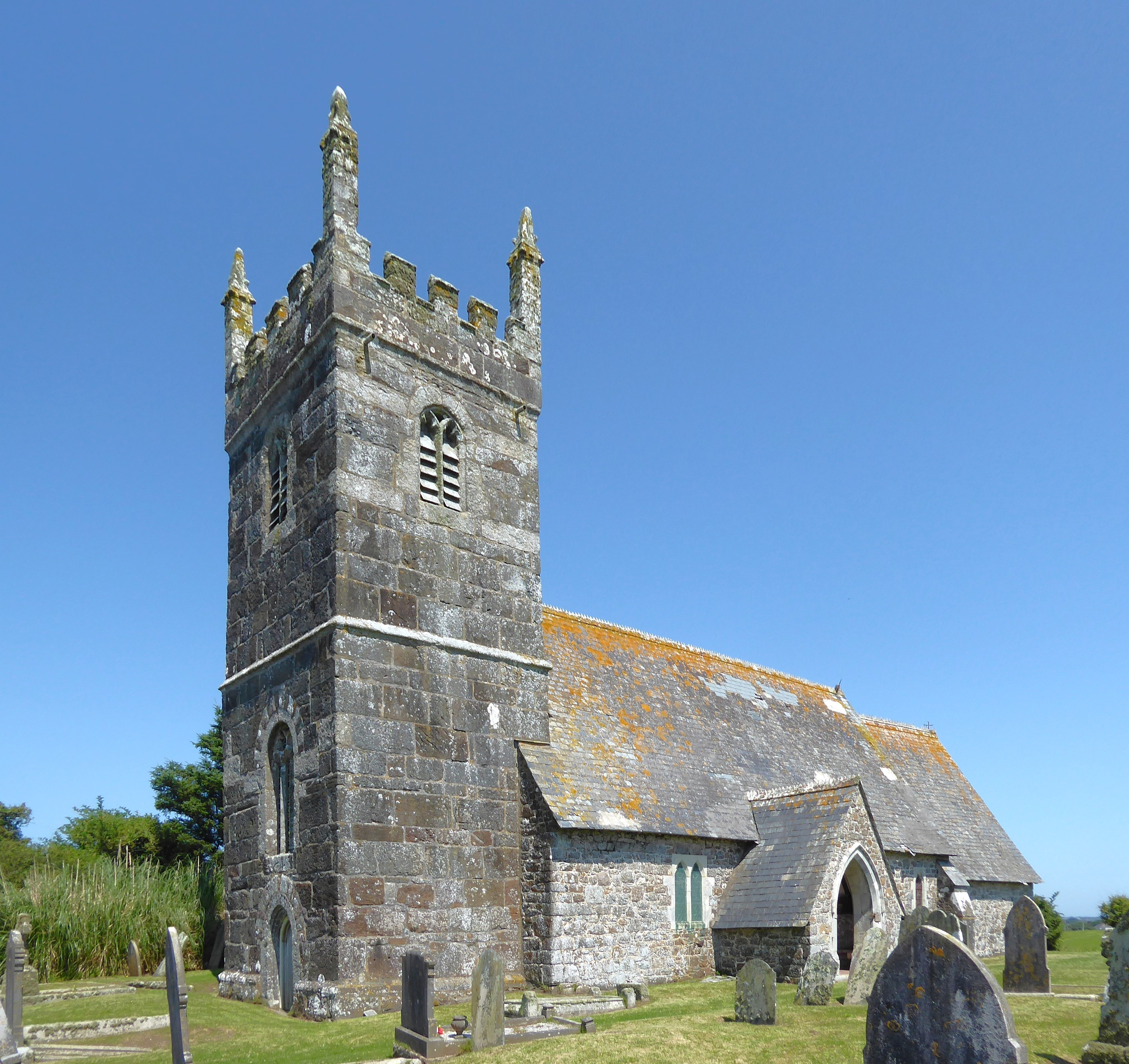
- St Grada & Holy Cross Church, Grade
- St Grada & Holy Cross Church, Grade
- Location: Grade
- Country: England
- Denomination: Church of England

History
- Dedication: St Grada & Holy Cross

Administration
- Province: Province of Canterbury
- Diocese: Diocese of Truro
- Archdeaconry: Cornwall
- Deanery: Kerrier
- Parish: St Ruan with St Grade
- Location within Cornwall

Listed Building – Grade I
- Official name: Church of St Grade
- Designated: 10 July 1957
- Reference no.: 1141938

St Grada & Holy Cross Church, Grade is the Church of England parish church of Grade with Ruan, Cornwall. The church is a Grade I listed building, having been added to the listed buildings register on 10 July 1957.

== History ==
The parish was called St Cross in 1261, but by 1310 it was known as St Grada, Virgin. The font dates from the 13th century and the church contains a brass to James Eryssy and his wife, 1522.

Parts of the church, which is built in the Decorated style, are of thirteenth century origin and the tower dates from around 1400. The thirteenth and fourteenth century nave and chancel were rebuilt in 1862−63, incorporating some of the original structure to the designs of the architect Edward William Godwin of Bristol. The construction is mainly of rubble stone, with some large blocks of granite and serpentine in the tower. There are separate slated, steeply-sloping roofs for the nave, chancel, vestry and porch. The unbuttressed tower is at the west end and has two stages. The font from the previous church was retained. The serpentine and Caen pulpit was the gift of the Lizard Serpentine Company. The lectern was the gift of Mr Cox, the agent of the company. The church was reopened for worship on 24 July 1863.

The funds for the rebuilding in 1862−63 ran out and it was not until 1882 that an organ chamber and vestry were built, according to the original plans of Godwin. The organ was built by Brewer and Co of Truro and the new organ was ″opened″ on 12 March 1885 when a recital was given by Mr G R Sinclair, the organist of Truro Cathedral. The specification of the organ can be found on the National Pipe Organ Register.

In 1966, St Grada's was used as a filming location for the Doctor Who serial, The Smugglers.

== Parish status ==
The settlements of Grade, Ruan Major and Ruan Minor were united into a single civil parish called Grade-Ruan in 1934. The former parish church of Ruan Major is now in ruins. St Grada & Holy Cross is part of a group of parishes comprising:

- St Grada & Holy Cross Church, Grade
- St Wynwallow's Church, Landewednack
- St Rumon's Church, Ruan Minor
- St Mary's Church, Cadgwith

== Gallery ==
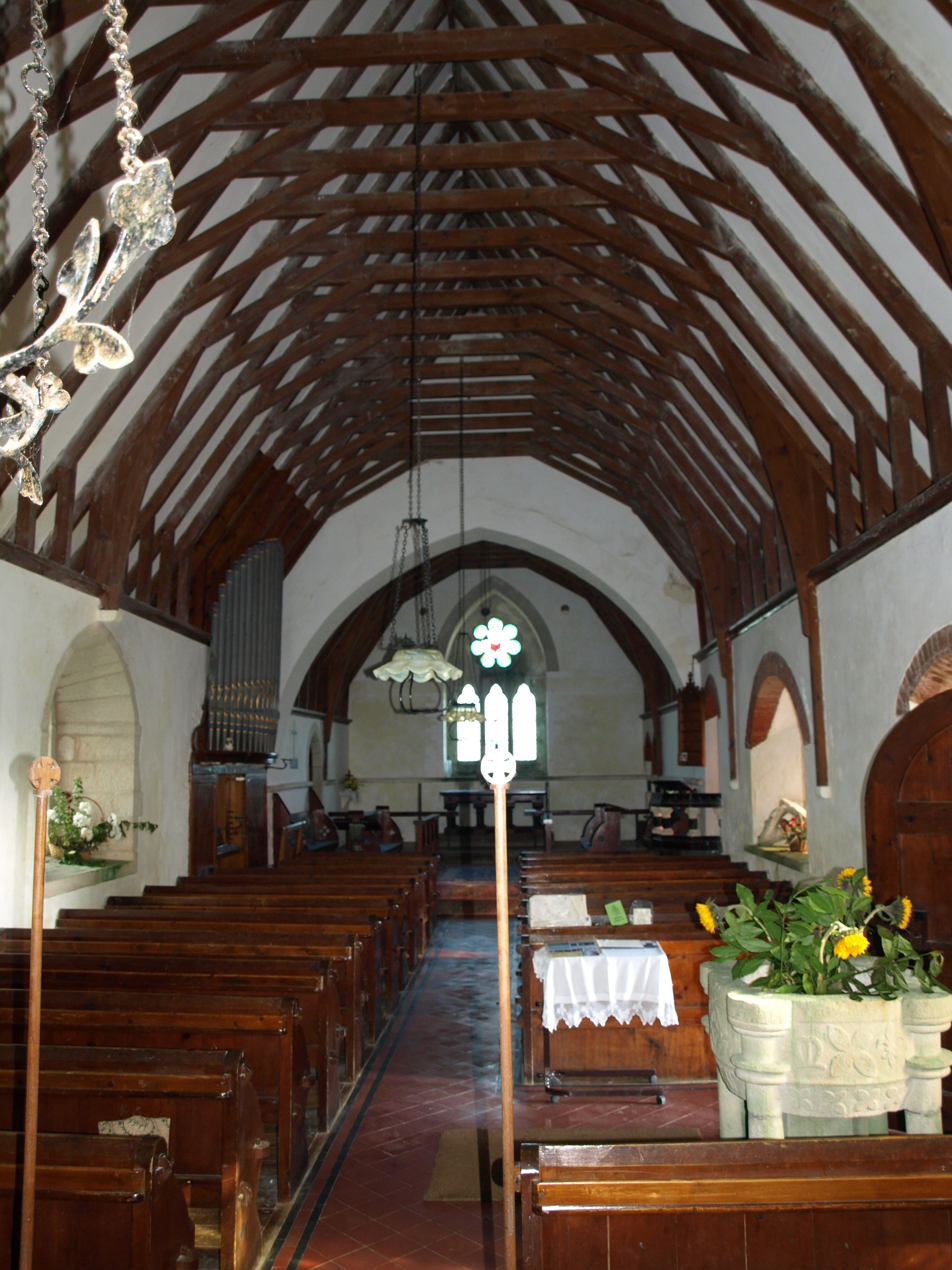
Interior looking east

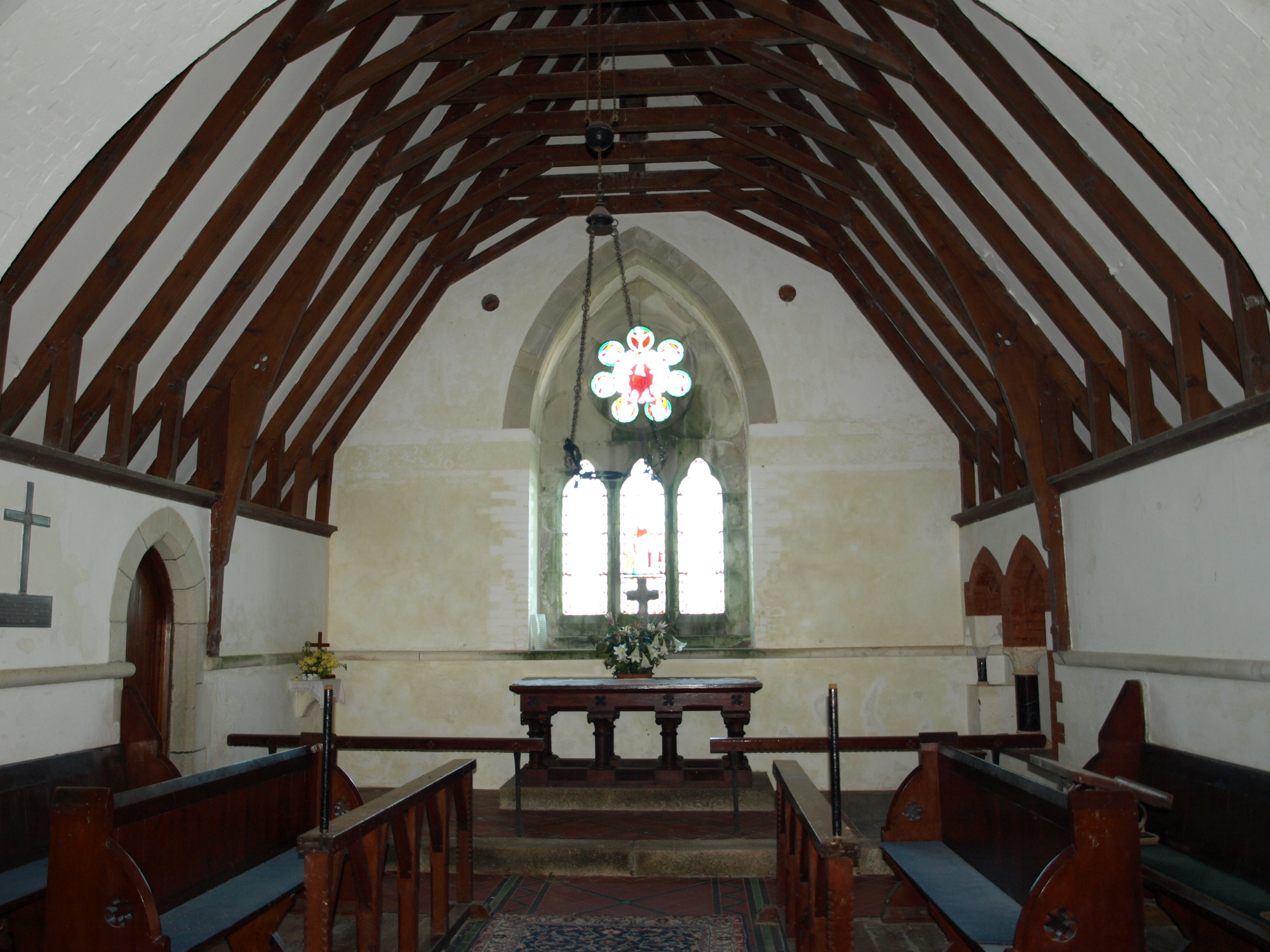
Sanctuary

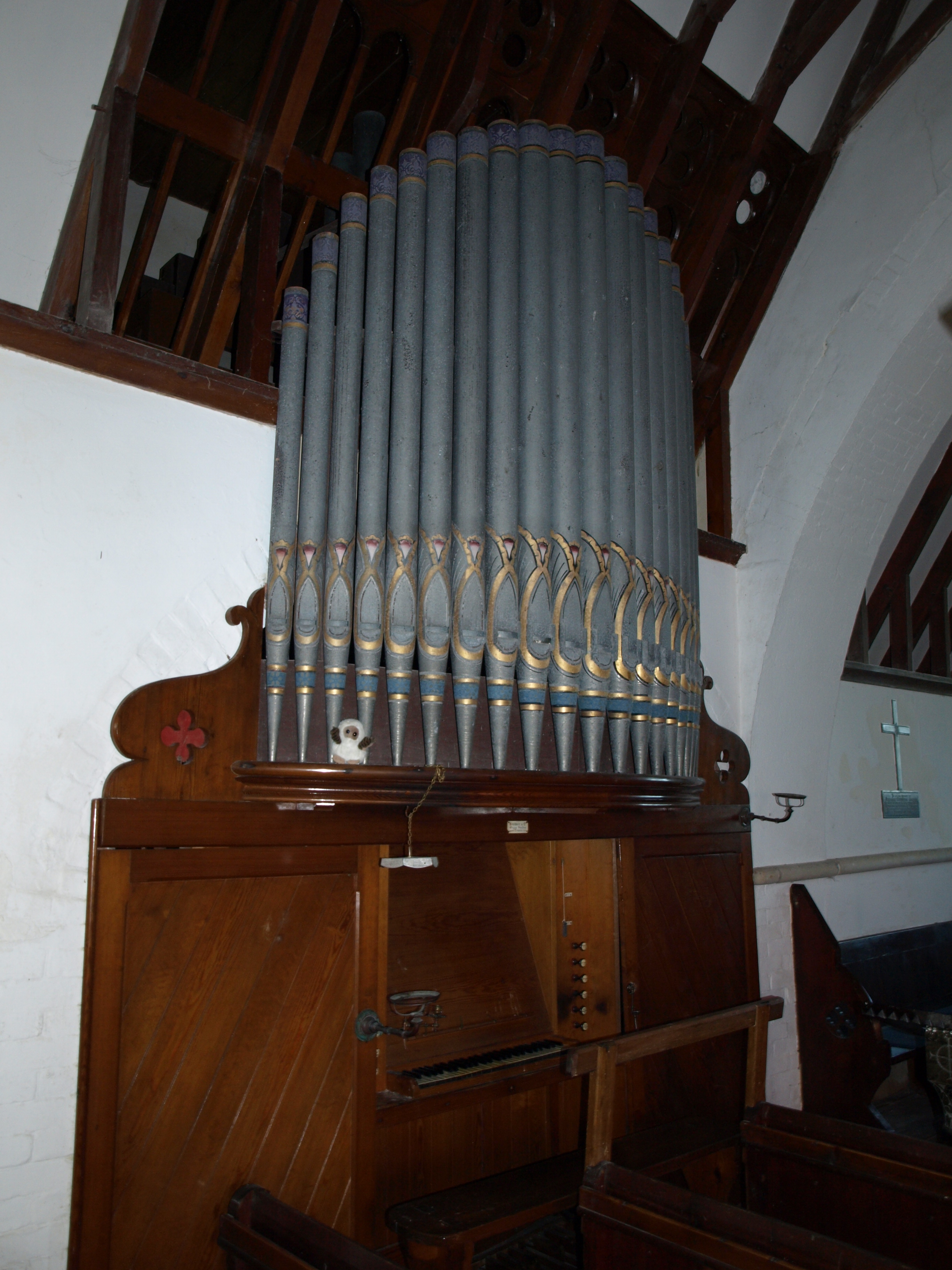
The organ
