= Landewednack =

Coordinates: 49.970°N 5.193°W

Landewednack: Cornish: Lanndewydnek
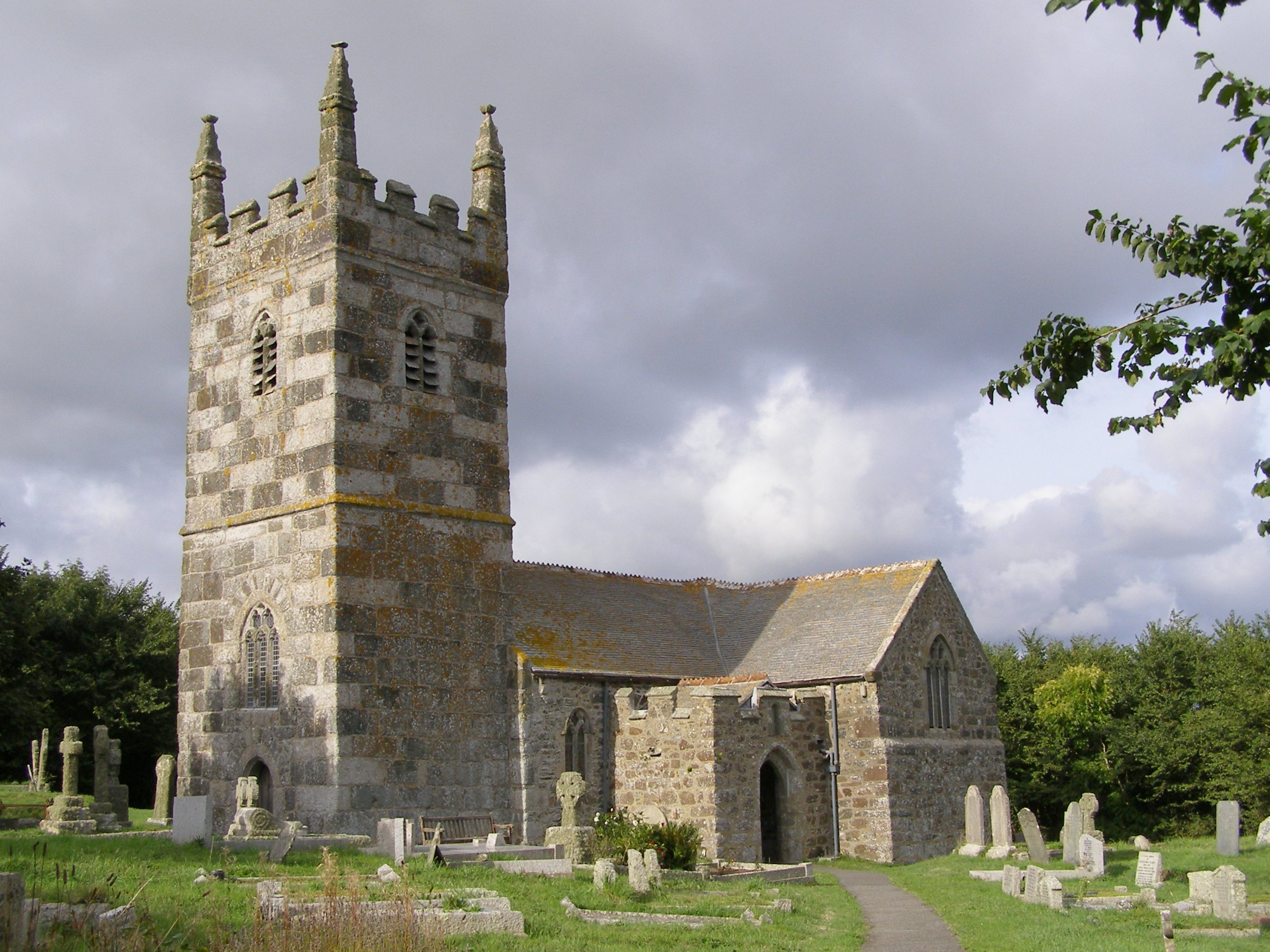
- St Wynwallow's church at Landewednack

- Location within Cornwall
- Interactive map of Landewednack
- Population: 906 (United Kingdom Census 2011)
- OS grid reference: SW706123
- Unitary authority: Cornwall
- Ceremonial county: Cornwall
- Region: South West
- Country: England
- Sovereign state: United Kingdom
- Post town: HELSTON
- Postcode district: TR12
- Dialling code: 01326
- Police: Devon and Cornwall
- Fire: Cornwall
- Ambulance: South Western
- UK Parliament: St Ives

Landewednack (Cornish: Lanndewydnek (hamlet) or Pluw Wydnek (parish)) is a civil parish and an area of The Lizard in Cornwall, England, United Kingdom. The hamlet is situated approximately ten miles (16 km) south of Helston.

Landewednack is the most southerly parish on the British mainland. The parish church, dedicated to St Winwallow, is the most southerly in England and is built of local serpentine stone (see St Wynwallow's Church, Landewednack). Caerthillian cove and beach sits on the western border of the parish.

The hamlet of Landewednack is now part of Lizard village.

== Twinning ==
Landewednack is twinned with Landévennec (Breton: Landevenneg) in Brittany, France.
