= List of Anglo-Saxon charters =

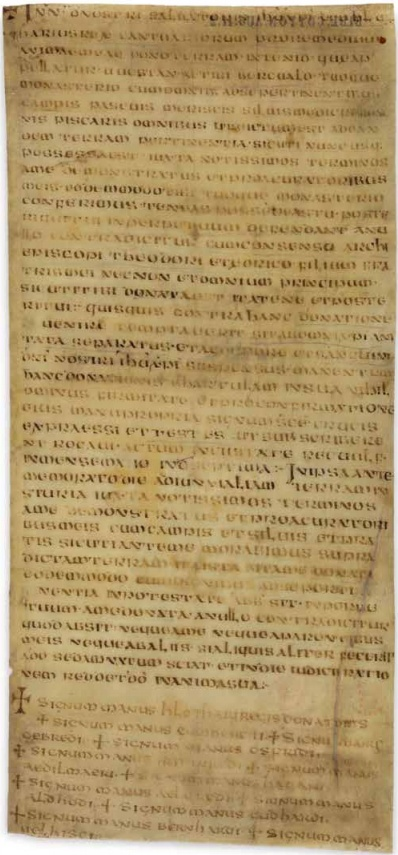
Charter of King Hlothhere of Kent (AD 679), the oldest surviving authentic Anglo-Saxon charter (Sawyer 8)

This article lists Anglo-Saxon charters, writs, wills, records of disputes and other miscellaneous memoranda from the 7th to 11th centuries. It is from three principal sources:

- Codex Diplomaticus Aevi Saxonici (1839–48) by John Mitchell Kemble
- Cartularium Saxonicum (1885-1893) by Walter de Gray Birch
- Anglo Saxon Charters: An Annotated List by Peter Sawyer (1968)

Sawyer's list has been digitised and updated as the Electronic Sawyer. The list in this article does not include charters discovered since Sawyer's 1968 publication and included in the Electronic Sawyer

In Anglo-Saxon scholarship today, documents are referred to by their Sawyer number (e.g. S 123). Older publications cite the Kemble number (K 123) or Birch number (B 123).

== Geographic distribution ==
Ann Goodier made a study of the geographic distribution of the estates mentioned in the known Anglo-Saxon Charters, however this was never published. A map derived from her work appeared in Hill (1981).

== Publication history ==
The corpus of Anglo-Saxon charters was first collected by John Mitchell Kemble for their value to legal history whilst he was a law student at Trinity College Cambridge; these he published as the Codex Diplomaticus Aevi Saxonici in 6 volumes 1839-48. Facsimiles of some of the charters were published by the British Museum (1873–78) and the Ordnance Survey (1878-1884). These demonstrated inaccuracies in Kemble's work and together with the discoveries of new charters in the intervening 4 decades, this provided motivation for Birch to revisit the corpus in his Cartularium Saxonicum (1885-1893). Florence Harmer published select documents in 1914. H P R Finberg and Cyril Roy Hart published county by county studies of Anglo-Saxon Charters between the 1950s-1970s. Sawyer's Annotated List and Bibliography was published in 1968; it includes descriptions, academically ascribed dates and comments on authenticity but not the original charter texts. The British Academy's Anglo-Saxon Charters series began in 1973 with publication of the charters of Rochester cathedral. The series publishes the full charter texts together with bibliographic references and diplomatic and codicological commentary; the most recent volume (20) was published in 2021.

An ongoing parallel project by the Arizona center for medieval and Renaissance studies, Anglo-Saxon Manuscripts in Microfiche Facsimile (1994-2020; 28 vols), aims to publish all Old English manuscripts.

The Electronic Sawyer project publishes Sawyer's original Annotated List via their website but has extensively updated the bibliography to reflect material published post 1968.

The Prosopography of Anglo-Saxon England project maintains a relational database of all named entities (e.g. people, places) mentioned in the corpus of Anglo-Saxon Charters, principally based on the work of Simon Keynes.

== Bibliography ==
- Birch, Walter de Gray (1885). Cartularium saxonicum: a collection of charters relating to Anglo-Saxon history: AD 430-738. Vol. 1 Pt.1. London: Whiting.
- Birch, Walter de Gray (1885). Cartularium saxonicum: a collection of charters relating to Anglo-Saxon history: AD 741-839. Vol. 1 Pt.2. London: Whiting.
- Birch, Walter de Gray (1887). Cartularium saxonicum: a collection of charters relating to Anglo-Saxon history: AD 840-928. Vol. 2 Pt.1. London: Whiting.
- Birch, Walter de Gray (1887). Cartularium saxonicum: a collection of charters relating to Anglo-Saxon history: AD 928-947. Vol. 2 Pt.2. London: Whiting.
- Birch, Walter de Gray (1893). Cartularium saxonicum: a collection of charters relating to Anglo-Saxon history: AD 948-959. Vol. 3. London: Whiting.
- Birch, Walter de Gray (1899). Inder Saxonicus: An Index to All the Names of Persons in the Cartularium Saxonicum. London: Phillimore & Company.
- Kemble, John Mitchell (1839). Codex diplomaticus aevi saxonici. Vol. 1. London: Sumptibus Societatis. Covers numbers 1-240.
- Kemble, John Mitchell (1840). Codex diplomaticus aevi saxonici. Vol. 2. London: Sumptibus Societatis. Covers numbers 241-527.
- Kemble, John Mitchell (1845). Codex diplomaticus aevi saxonici. Vol. 3. London: Sumptibus Societatis. Covers numbers 528-726.
- Kemble, John Mitchell (1846). Codex diplomaticus aevi saxonici. Vol. 4. London: Sumptibus Societatis. Covers numbers 727-981.
- Kemble, John Mitchell (1847). Codex diplomaticus aevi saxonici. Vol. 5. London: Sumptibus Societatis. Covers numbers 982-1217.
- Kemble, John Mitchell (1848). Codex diplomaticus aevi saxonici. Vol. 6. London: Sumptibus Societatis. Covers numbers 1218-1369.
- Sanders, William Basevi (1878). Facsimiles of Anglo-Saxon Manuscripts. Vol. 1. Southampton: Ordnance Survey Office.
- Sanders, William Basevi (1881). Facsimiles of Anglo-Saxon Manuscripts. Vol. 2. Southampton: Ordnance Survey Office.
- Sanders, William Basevi (1884). Facsimiles of Anglo-Saxon Manuscripts. Vol. 3. Southampton: Ordnance Survey Office.
- Sawyer, Peter (1968). Anglo-Saxon Charters: an annotated list and bibliography. London: Royal Historical Society.
- Whitelock, Dorothy (1930). Anglo Saxon Wills. Cambridge University Press.

== Online resources ==
- The Electronic Sawyer: Online Catalogue of Anglo-Saxon Charters - This project has digitized Sawyer's original Annotated List, which can be searched used using Sawyer, Birch or Kemble numbers. It includes the texts of the charters - and translations into English where available. It also includes corrections, charters discovered since Sawyer's original publication in 1968, and citation of references to each charter in academic publications. The references have not been updated since the early 2000s.
- ASChart Project - This project published the text of all charters up to AD 900, e.g. Sawyer 1-357, and a few select others from later dates.
- Prosopography of Anglo-Saxon England - This project publishes their relational database of all named entities in Anglo-Saxon charters and Domesday.

== Sawyer's Catalogue ==
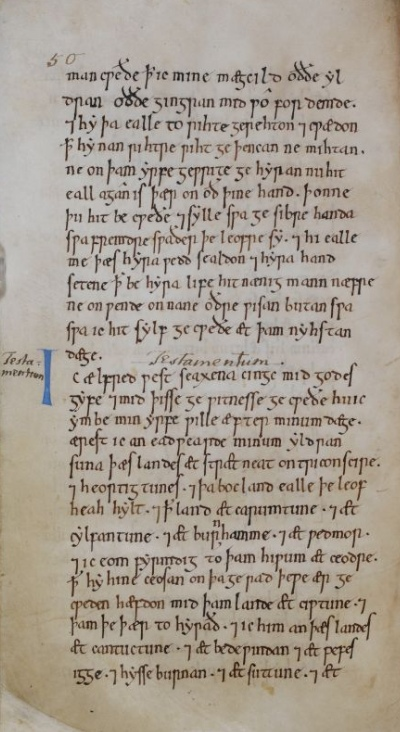
Alfred the Great's Will (S 1507)

The table below gives Sawyer's original listing of the charters, here arranged chronologically starting with royal diplomas and writs, then non-royal grants by the laity, bishops and other ecclesiastics; and finally by miscellaneous texts, wills and boundary descriptions.

Royal diplomas and writs
S 1–41	Kings of Kent
S 42–50	Kings of Sussex
S 51–63	Rulers of the Hwicce
S 64–65	Kings of Essex
S 66	King of Northumbria
S 67–226	Rulers of Mercia (to Æthelflæd)
S 227–357	Kings of Wessex (to Alfred)
S 358–385	Edward the Elder (899–924)
S 386–458	Æthelstan (924–39)
S 459–515	Edmund (939–46)
S 516–580	Eadred (946–55)
S 581–666	Eadwig (955–9)
S 667–827	Edgar (959–75)
S 828–832	Edward the Martyr (975–8)
S 833–946	Æthelred II (978–1016) [S 945–6 are writs]
S 947–948	Edmund Ironside (1016)
S 949–992	Cnut (1016–35) [S 985–92 are writs]
S 993–997	Harthacnut (1035–7, 1040–2) [S 996–7 are writs]
S 998–1162	Edward the Confessor (1042–1066) [S 1063–1162 are writs]
S 1163	Harold (1066) [a writ]
Non-royal (private) charters
S 1164–1243	Grants by the laity
S 1244–1409	Grants by bishops
S 1410–1428	Grants by other ecclesiastics
S 1429–1481	Miscellaneous texts (memoranda, records of disputes, etc.)
Wills and bequests
S 1482–1539	
Boundary clauses
S 1540–1602	
Lost and incomplete texts
S 1603–1875	

== List of Anglo-Saxon charters ==
The following table lists Anglo Saxon charters together with their Sawyer, Birch and Kemble numbers, which can be sorted to preference. Additional columns provide the ascribed date, grantor, grantee, description, language/place of production and reigning King; all after Sawyer (1968). The texts and bibliographic details are available in the Electronic Sawyer.

S	B	K	Date	Grantor	Grantee	Description	Language/Location	King
1	3		A.D. 604 (28 April)	Æthelberht, king	St Andrew and his church at Rochester	Grant of land at Rochester, Kent.	Latin with English bounds, Rochester	Æthelberht (of Kent)
2	4		A.D. 605 (Canterbury)	Æthelberht, king of Kent	St Peter	Grant of land to the east of Canterbury for the foundation of a minster.	Latin with English bounds, Canterbury, St Augustine's	Æthelberht (of Kent)
3	5		A.D. 605 (Canterbury)	Æthelberht, king of the English	St Augustine for the minster of SS Peter and Paul (St Augustine's), Canterbury	Grant of land to the east of Canterbury.	Latin with bounds, Canterbury, St Augustine's	Æthelberht (of Kent)
4	6		A.D. 605 (9 Jan)	Æthelberht, king of the English	the church of SS Peter and Paul (St Augustine's), Canterbury	Grant of land at Sturry alias Chislet, Kent.	Latin, Canterbury, St Augustine's	Æthelberht (of Kent)
5	8		A.D. 604 x 616	Æthelberht, king	Mellitus, bishop, and St Paul's minster	Grant of land at Tillingham, Essex.	Latin, London, St Paul's	Æthelberht (of Kent)
6	13		A.D. 618	Eadbald, king	the minster of SS Peter and Paul (St Augustine's), Canterbury	Grant of 30 sulungs (aratra) at Northbourne, Kent.	Latin, Canterbury, St Augustine's	Eadbald (of Kent)
7	36		A.D. 675 (1 April)	Hlothhere, king of Kent	St Peter's Minster (St Augustine's), Canterbury	Grant of 3 sulungs (aratra) in Stodmarsh, Kent.	Latin, Canterbury, St Augustine's	Hlothhere (of Kent)
8	45		A.D. 679 (Reculver, May)	Hlothhere, king of Kent	Abbot Beorhtwald and his minster	Grant of land at Westanae on the Isle of Thanet, and in Sturry, Kent.	Latin, Canterbury, Christ Church (ex Reculver)	Hlothhere (of Kent)
9	67		A.D. 686 (June)	Eadric, king of Kent	St Peter's Minster (St Augustine's), Canterbury	Grant of 3 sulungs (aratra) near Stodmarsh, Kent.	Latin with bounds, Canterbury, St Augustine's	Eadric (of Kent)
10	42		A.D. 689 (Canterbury, 1 March)	Swæfheard (Suabhardus), king of Kent	Æbba, abbess (of Minster-in-Thanet)	Grant of 44 hides (manentes) in Sudaneie in Thanet, and 12 hides in Sturry, Kent; with confirmation by Æthelred, king of Mercia, A.D. 691 (? Marefield and Stapleford, Leicestershire, 8 January).	Latin, Canterbury, St Augustine's (ex Minster-in-Thanet)	Swæfheard (of Kent)
11	41		circa A.D. 690	Swæfheard (Suabertus), king of Kent	Æbba, abbess (of Minster-in-Thanet)	Grant of 2 sulungs (aratra) in Sturry and 3 at Bodsham, Kent.	Latin, Canterbury, St Augustine's	Swæfheard (of Kent)
12	73		A.D. 689 (July)	Oswine, king of Kent	St Peter's Minster (St Augustine's, Canterbury) and Abbot Hadrian	Grant of 1 sulung (aratrum) of iron-bearing land, formerly belonging to the royal vill at Lyminge, Kent.	Latin, Canterbury, St Augustine's	Oswine (of Kent)
13	35		A.D. 690 (27 January)	Oswine, king of Kent	Æbba, abbess (of Minster-in-Thanet)	Grant of 10 hides (manentes) in Sturry, Kent.	Latin, Canterbury, St Augustine's (ex Minster-in-Thanet)	Oswine (of Kent)
14	40		circa A.D. 690	Oswine, king of Kent	Æbba, abbess (of Minster-in-Thanet)	Grant of 18 hides (manentes) in the Isle of Thanet, Kent.	Latin, Canterbury, St Augustine's (ex Minster-in-Thanet)	Oswine (of Kent)
15	86		A.D. 694 (17 July)	Wihtred, king of Kent	Æbba, abbess	Grant of 4 sulungs (aratra) at Humantun in Thanet, Kent.	Latin, Canterbury, St Augustine's (ex Minster-in-Thanet)	Wihtred (of Kent)
16	90		A.D. 696 or 711 (March)		St Peter's Minster (St Augustine's), Canterbury	Grant of 5 sulungs (aratra) at Littlebourne, Kent.	Latin, Canterbury, St Augustine's	Wihtred (of Kent)
17	88		A.D. 696 (Berkamystede, Feb)	Wihtred, king of Kent	Mildrith, abbess	Grant of privileges for Minster-in-Thanet, Kent.	Latin, Canterbury, St Augustine's (ex Minster-in-Thanet)	Wihtred (of Kent)
18	96		A.D. 697 (April)	Wihtred, king of Kent	Abbess Æbba	Grant of 40 hides (manentes) at Hæg.	Latin, Canterbury, St Augustine's (ex Minster-in-Thanet)	Wihtred (of Kent)
19	97		A.D. 697 or 712 (July)	Wihtred, king of Kent	St Mary's Church, Lyminge	Grant of 4 sulungs (aratra) at Pleghelmestun, Kent.	Latin with bounds, Canterbury, Christ Church (ex Lyminge)	Wihtred (of Kent)
20	99		A.D. 699 (Cilling, 8 April)	Wihtred, king of Kent	the churches and monasteries of Kent	Confirmation of privileges.	Latin, Canterbury, Christ Church and Canterbury, St Augustine's	Wihtred (of Kent)
21	98		A.D. 700 or 715	Wihtred, king of Kent	St Mary's Church, Lyminge	Grant of 4 sulungs (aratra) at Pleghelmestun and pasture in Romney Marsh.	Latin with bounds, Canterbury, Christ Church (ex Lyminge)	Wihtred (of Kent)
22	91		A.D. 699 x 716 (Bapchild, Kent)	Wihtred, king of Kent	the churches and monasteries of Kent	Grant of privileges and immunity to the churches and monasteries of Kent, with specific prohibition of lay domination over St Peter's at Upmynster, Reculver, Minster-in-Thanet, Dover, Folkestone, Lyminge, Minster-in-Sheppey and Hoo. Confirmation, dated A.D. 716, at a synod at Cloveshoh.	Latin, Canterbury, Christ Church	Wihtred (of Kent)
23	148		A.D. 732 (Canterbury, 20 Feb)	Æthelberht II, king of Kent	Dunn, priest and abbot, and the church of St Mary (Lyminge)	Grant of land by the river Limen and at Sandtun (Sampton, lost, in West Hythe), Kent.	Latin with bounds, Canterbury, Christ Church (ex Lyminge)	Æthelberht II (of Kent)
24	160		A.D. 741 (Lyminge)	Æthelberht II, king of Kent	the church of St Mary, Lyminge	Grant of fishing rights in the river Limen, land around the oratorium of St Martin (? at New Romney), and pasture at Biscopes wic (The Wicks, Broomhill, Kent).	Latin with bounds, Canterbury, Christ Church (ex Lyminge)	Æthelberht II (of Kent)
25	191		A.D. 762	Æthelberht II, king of Kent	the minster of SS Peter and Paul (St Augustine's) Canterbury	Exchange whereby the minster cedes the half-use of a mill to the royal vill at Wye, Kent, in return for pasture rights in the Weald for its tenant at Chart, Kent.	Latin, Canterbury, St Augustine's	Æthelberht II (of Kent)
26	846		A.D. 727 (14 October)	Eadberht I, king of Kent	Abbess Mildrith (of Minster-in-Thanet) and her familia	Grant of a half-sulung (aratrum) of land bi Northanwde.	Latin, Canterbury, St Augustine's (ex Minster-in-Thanet)	Eadberht I (of Kent)
27	159		A.D. 738 (Canterbury, April)	(a) Eadberht I, king of Kent	Ealdwulf, bishop, and the see of St Andrew	Grant of 10 sulungs (aratra) at Stoke in Hoo, Kent. (b) Bishop Ealdwulf presents the charter to King Æthelberht II and Archbishop Nothhelm for confirmation.	Latin, Rochester	Eadberht I (of Kent)
28	190		A.D. 762 or 763 (Canterbury, 25 July)	Eadberht II, king of Kent	St Peter's Minster (St Augustine's), Canterbury	Grant of 6 sulungs (aratra) at Mongeham, Kent, with rights in woodland at Singledge, Kent.	Latin, Canterbury, St Augustine's	Eadberht II (of Kent)
29	189		A.D. 763 or 764	Eadberht II, king of Kent	Sigeburga, abbess, and her familia at St Peter's Minster, Thanet	Remission of toll due on two ships at Fordwich, and on a third at Fordwich and Sarre, Kent.	Latin, Canterbury, St Augustine's (ex Minster-in-Thanet)	Eadberht II (of Kent)
30	175		A.D. 762 for circa 748 x 760	Eardwulf, king of Kent	the church of St Andrew, Rochester	Grant of pasture rights at Holanspic, at Petteridge in Brenchley, and at Lindridge, Kent.	Latin, Rochester	Eardwulf (of Kent)
31	176		circa A.D. 748 x 762	Eardwulf, king of Kent	Heaberht, abbot, and his familia in the minster at Reculver	Grant of 1 sulung (aratrum) at Perhamstede in Higham Upshire, Kent.	Latin, Canterbury, Christ Church (ex Reculver)	Eardwulf (of Kent)
32	193		A.D. 762	Sigered, king of Kent	Eardwulf, bishop, to augment his monastery	Grant of 1.5 iugera in the northern part of the city of Rochester, Kent.	Latin with bounds, Rochester	Sigered (of Kent)
33	194		A.D. 761 x 764 (probably 762 x 764)	Sigered, king of half Kent	Eardwulf, bishop of Rochester	Grant of 20 sulungs (aratra) at Islingham, Kent, and swine-pastures in the western Weald, with confirmation by King Eanmund.	Latin, Rochester	Sigered (of Kent)
34	196		A.D. 765	Egbert, king of Kent	Eardwulf, bishop	Grant of land at Rochester, confirmed by Heahberht, king of Kent, and (A.D. 765 x 772, Medeshamstede) by Offa, king of Mercia.	Latin, Rochester	Ecgberht (of Kent)
35	227		A.D. 778 (Canterbury)	Egbert, king of Kent	Deora, bishop of Rochester	Grant of a half sulung (aratrum) at Bromhey in Frindsbury, Kent, and a marsh called Scaga. With bounds of appurtenant meadows in Hreodham (? Redham in Cliffe, Kent).	Latin with bounds, Rochester	Ecgberht (of Kent)
36	228		A.D. 779 (Rochester)	Egbert, king of Kent	Deora, bishop of Rochester	Grant of a half sulung (aratrum) at Bromhey in Frindsbury, Kent, and a marsh on the Iaenlade (? Yantlet Creek).	Latin, Rochester	Ecgberht (of Kent)
37	260		A.D. 765 x 785	Egbert, king of Kent	Deora, bishop of Rochester, and the church of St Andrew	Grant of 10 sulungs (aratra) at Halling, Kent, with appurtenant swine-pastures at Bixle, Speldhurst, Mæreden, Rusthall and Teppanhyse, Kent.	Latin with bounds, Rochester	Ecgberht (of Kent)
38	243		A.D. 784	Ealhmund, king of Kent	Wihtred, abbot, and his familia at Reculver	Grant of 12 sulungs (aratra) at Sheldwich, Kent.	Latin, Canterbury, Christ Church (ex Reculver)	Ealhmund (of Kent)
39	1336		A.D. 805	Cuthred, king of Kent	Aldberht, his minister, and Selethryth, abbess	Grant of 2 sulungs (aratra) at Ruckinge, Kent.	Latin, Canterbury, Christ Church (ex Lyminge)	Cuthred (of Kent)
40	322		A.D. 805 (26 July, Acleah)	Cuthred, king of Kent	Wulfred, archbishop	Grant of 2 sulungs (aratra) at Hrithra leah, part of an estate of 15 hides (manentes) at Buckholt in Petham, Kent, in return for 30 mancuses.	Latin, Canterbury, Christ Church	Cuthred (of Kent)
41	318		A.D. 805 x 807	Cuthred, king of Kent	Æthelnoth, praefectus	Grant of 3 sulungs (aratra) at Eythorne, Kent, in return for 3000 pence.	Latin, Canterbury, Christ Church	Cuthred (of Kent)
42	132		A.D. 714 (? for 717 or 724)	Nunna, king of Sussex	Beadufrith and the brethren of Selsey	Grant of 4 hides (manentes) at Herotunun, 3 (cassati) at Tættæshamstede and 3 at Sidlesham, Sussex.	Latin, Selsey	Nunna (of Sussex)
43	144		A.D. 775 for circa 705 x circa 717	Nunna, king of Sussex	Eadberht, bishop	Grant of 20 hides (tributarii) at Hugabeorgum and Dene (probably East and West Dean near Chichester, Sussex).	Latin with English bounds, Selsey	Nunna (of Sussex)
44	145		(a) A.D. circa 705 x (? 716 x ?)	Nunna, king of Sussex	Berhfrith, famulus Dei	Grant of four hides (tributarii) at Peppering by the river Arun (Tarente), Sussex.	Latin, Selsey	Nunna (of Sussex)
45	78		A.D. 692	Nothhelm (Nunna), king of Sussex	Nothgyth, his sister	Grant, in order to found a minster, of 33 hides (cassati) at Lidsey, Aldingbourne, Lenstedegate (? Westergate in Aldington) and (North) Mundham, Sussex.	Latin, Selsey	Nothhelm (of Sussex)
46	211		A.D. 733 x (747 x circa 765)	Æthelberht, king of Sussex	Diosza	Grant, for the construction of a minster, of 18 hides (tributarii) at Wittering, Sussex, with a note of the transfer of the land by Diosza to his sister and confirmation by Offa, king of Mercia.	Latin, Selsey	Æthelberht (of Sussex)
47	212		No Date.	Æthelberht, king of Sussex	Wilfrid, bishop	Grant of a half-hide (tributarius) at Chichester, Sussex.	Latin, Selsey	Æthelberht (of Sussex)
48	198		A.D. 762 probably for 765	Osmund (king)	Walhhere, his comes	Grant, for the construction of a minster, of 12 hides (tributarii) at Ferring, Sussex.	Latin, Selsey	Osmund (of Sussex)
49	206		A.D. 770	Osmund, king	Wærbald, comes, and his wife Tidburh, for St Peter's Church (Henfield)	Grant of 15 hides (manentes) at Henfield, Sussex, with later confirmation by Offa, king of Mercia.	Latin, Selsey	Osmund (of Sussex)
50	197		circa A.D. 765	Ealdwulf, king	Hunlaf, his comes	Grant, in order to found a minster, of 16 hides (casata) at Stanmer, Lindfield and Burleigh, Sussex, with confirmation by Offa, king of Mercia.	Latin with English bounds, Canterbury, Christ Church (? ex Selsey)	Ealdwulf (of Sussex)
51	43		A.D. 676 (= 675, 6 Nov)	Osric, king	Bertana, abbess	Grant of 100 hides (manentes) at Bath, Somerset, for the foundation of a nunnery.	Latin, Bath	Osric (of Hwicce)
52	51		A.D. 680	Oshere, king	Frithuwald, monk of Bishop Winfrid (? for Wilfrid)	Grant of 30 hides (manentes) at Ripple, Worcestershire	Latin, Worcester	Oshere (of Hwicce)
53	85		(A.D. 693)	Oshere, king of the Hwicce	Cuthswith, abbess	Grant of 15 hides (tributarii) at Penintanham (probably Inkberrow, Worcestershire) and Dyllawidu (?), for the foundation of a minster.	Latin, Worcester	Oshere (of Hwicce)
54	116		A.D. 706	Æthelweard, subregulus, with the consent of Cenred, king of Mercia	Ecgwine, bishop, for St Mary's Church, Cronuchomme (Evesham)	Grant of 12 hides (cassati) at Ombersley, Worcestershire, with later confirmations by Ceolred, Æthelbald and Offa, kings of Mercia.	Latin with English bounds, Evesham	Æthelweard (of Hwicce)
55	183		A.D. 757	Eanberht, Uhtred and Ealdred, under-kings of the Hwicce	Milred, bishop, and St Peter's, Worcester	Grant of 30 hides (cassati) at Tredington, Warwickshire (formerly Worcestershire), previously held by Tyrdda, comes.	Latin with English bounds, Worcester	Eanberht, Uhtred and Ealdred (of Hwicce)
56	187		A.D. 759 (February)	Eanberht, Uhtred and Ealdred, brothers and under-kings of the Hwicce, with the permission of Offa, king of Mercia	Headda, abbot	Grant of 10 hides (cassati) at Andoversford, Gloucestershire	Latin with English bounds, Worcester	Eanberht, Uhtred and Ealdred (of Hwicce)
57	232		A.D. 756 for 777 x 779	Uhtred, ruler of the Hwicce, with the permission of Offa, king of Mercia	Ceolmund, minister	Grant of 8 hides (mansiones) at Kemerton, Worcestershire	Latin with bounds, Worcester	Uhtred (of Hwicce)
58	202		A.D. 767	Uhtred, regulus of the Hwicce, with the permission of Offa, king of Mercia	Æthelmund, his faithful minister, son of Ingeld, dux and præfectus	Grant of 5 hides (tributarii) at Aston in Stoke Prior, Worcestershire	Latin, Worcester	Uhtred (of Hwicce)
59	203		A.D. 770	Uhtred, regulus of the Hwicce, with the permission of Offa, king of Mercia	Æthelmund, his faithful minister	Grant, for three lives, of 5 hides (tributarii) at (Aston in Stoke Prior, Worcestershire), with reversion to the church of Worcester.	Latin with English bounds, Worcester	Uhtred (of Hwicce)
60	204		A.D. 770	Uhtred, regulus of the Hwicce, with the permission of Offa, king of Mercia	St Mary's Minster, Worcester	Grant of 10 hides (tributarii) at Stoke Prior, Worcestershire	Latin with English bounds, Worcester	Uhtred (of Hwicce)
61	205		A.D. 764 x 774	Uhtred, subregulus of the Hwicce, with the permission of Offa, king of Mercia	St Mary's Church, Worcester	Grant of 2 hides (mansiones) at Shipston-on-Stour, Warwickshire	Latin, Worcester	Uhtred (of Hwicce)
62	238		A.D. 777 x 780	Ealdred, subregulus of the Hwicce, with the permission of Bishop Tilhere	Æthelburh, his kinswoman	Lease, for life, of the minster at Fladbury, Worcestershire, with reversion to the bishopric of Worcester.	Latin, Worcester	Ealdred (of Hwicce)
63	218		A.D. 757 x 774	Ealdred, with the consent of Uhtred, his brother, and of Offa, king of Mercia	Beornheard, comes	Grant of 3 hides (cassati) at Huntena tun.	Latin, Worcester	Ealdred (of Hwicce)
64	123		A.D. 699 x 709	Offa, king of Mercia (? recte of Essex), also termed subregulus	the church of Worcester	Grant of 33 hides (cassati) at Shottery, 3 at Nuthurst, Warwickshire; and 3 at Hellerelege (lost, in Kings Norton), Worcestershire	Latin with bounds in Latin and English, Worcester	Offa (of Essex)
65	111		A.D. 704 (13 June)	Swæfred, king of Essex, and Pæogthath, comes, with the consent of Æthelred, king of Mercia	Waldhere, bishop	Grant of 30 hides (cassati) at Twickenham, Middlesex, with confirmation by Cenred and Ceolred, kings of Mercia. Ceolred's confirmation took place at Arcencale.	Latin with bounds, Canterbury, Christ Church	Swæfred (of Essex)
65a			A.D. circa 693 x 709	Swæfred, king (of Essex)	Fymme	Grant of 30 hides (manentes) in Nazeingbury, Essex.	Latin, Barking	Swæfred (of Essex)
65b			A.D. circa 693 x 706	Swæfred, king of Essex	Fymme	Grant of 10 hides (manentes) æt Tunende obre.	Latin, Barking	Swæfred (of Essex)
66	66		A.D. 685	Ecgfrith, king of Northumbria	Cuthbert	Grant of land at Crayke, Yorkshire N.R., and at Lugubalia (Carlisle).	Latin, Durham	Ecgfrith (of Northumbria)
67	32		A.D. 624 (? for 674)	Wulfhere, king of Mercia	Beorhtferth, his kinsman	Grant of 5 hides (manentes) at Dillington, Huntingdonshire, in return for 30 mancuses of gold.	Latin with English bounds, Worcester	Wulfhere (of Mercia)
68	22		A.D. 664	Wulfhere, king of Mercia	St Peter's Minster, Medeshamstede	Confirmation and grant of land at Peterborough (Medeshamstede), Thorpe Hall, Dogsthorpe, Eastfield near Peterborough, Newark, Garton End, Eye, Werrington, Gunthorpe, Peakirk, Glinton, Deeping Gate, Peakirk Marsh, Eye Marsh, the hermitage of Singleshole, Castor, Ailsworth, Sutton near Peterborough, Upton near Ailsworth, Milton Park, Barnack, Southorpe, Walcot Hall in Southorpe, Pilsgate, Ufford, Bainton, Ashton in Bainton, Torpel (lost) in Ufford, Thornhaugh, Sibberton Lodge in Thornhaugh, Wansford, Wittering, Wothrope, Burghley near Stamford, Maxey, Lolham Hall in Maxey, Nunton in Maxey, Helpston, Northborough, Etton, Woodcroft Castle in Etton, Paston, Walton, Marholm, Warmington, Oundle, Ashton Wold, Churchfield, Stoke, Benefield, Glapthorn, Cotterstock, Stanwick, Irthlingborough Kettering, Cottingham, East Carleton, Pytchley, Northampton, Northantss.; Olney, Buckinghamshire; Hoo and Avery Farm, Kent; Howden, Yorkshire ER; Breedon on the Hill, Leicestershire; Hrepingas (? Repton, Derbyshire); Cedenac; Swineshead, Lincolnshire; Heanbirig; Lodeshale; Shifnal, Shropshire.; Costesford (? Shropshire.), Stretteforde (? Stretford, Shropshire.), Wecelleburne, Lusgerde (Lizard Hill, Shropshire.); Ethelhuniglonde (? in Kent); Barchanig (Bardney, Lincolnshire); Langeledenham; Washingborough, Lincolnshire; Binnington, Yorkshire E.R.; Conisbrough, Yorkshire W.R.; Barnwell, Northamptonshire; Great Easton, Bringhurst, Prestgrave, Leicestershire; Drayton, Northamptonshire; Glaston, Rutland; Langton, Leicestershire; Tinwell, Ingthorpe, Rutland; Collingham, Nottinghamshire; Fiskerton, Reepham, Scotter, Scotterthorpe, Scotton, Northorpe, Yawthorpe, Riseholme, Messingham, Manton, Cleatham, Hibaldstowe, Ravensthorpe, Holme in Bottesford, Risby near Market Rasen, Walcot in Alkborough, Alkborough, Normanby, Althorpe, Lincolnshire; Muskham, Nottinghamshire; Thurlby, Osgodby in Lavington, Walcot near Folkingham, Breidesthorpe (? Bowthorpe), Lincolnshire; Ryhall, Belmesthorpe, Rutland; Manthorpe, Carlton Scroop, Quadring in Holland, Lincolnshire; Fletton, Orton and Alwalton, Huntingdonshire	Latin with bounds, Peterborough	Æthelred (of Mercia)
69	33		A.D. 666 x 675	Wulfhere, king of Mercia	the church of St Peter, Chertsey	Confirmation of grants of land by Frithuwold, subregulus, and Eorcenwold.	Latin, Chertsey	Æthelred (of Mercia)
70	60		A.D. 671 for ? 679 (Chelsea)	Æthelred, king of Mercia	Osric and Oswald, his noble ministri	Grant of 300 hides (tributarii) at Gloucester, Gloucestershire, to Osric, and 300 hides (cassati) at Pershore, Worcestershire, to Oswald; Osric's part being used by him for the foundation of a minster at Gloucester.	Latin, Gloucester, St Peter's	Æthelred (of Mercia)
71	59		A.D. 680 for 681	Æthelred, king of Mercia	Aldhelm, abbot	Grant of 15 hides (cassati) near Tetbury, Gloucestershire (The rubric in MSS 1 and 2 refers to Cherletune juxta Tetteburi.)	Latin, Malmesbury	Æthelred (of Mercia)
72	48		A.D. 680	Æthelred, king	St Peter's Minster, Medeshamstede	Grant, appended to a bull of Pope Agatho, of land at Breedon on the Hill, Leicestershire; Hrepingas (? Repton, Derbyshire); Cedenac; Swineshead, Lincolnshire; Heanbyrig; Lodeshale; Shifnal, Shropshire.; Costesford; Stretford (? Stretford, Shropshire.); Wattlesborough and Lizard, Shropshire.; Æthelhuniglond (? in Kent); and Bardney, Lincolnshire	Latin and English versions, Peterborough	Æthelred (of Mercia)
73	58		A.D. 681	Æthelred, king of Mercia	Aldhelm, abbot, and his successors	Grant of 30 hides (cassati) west of the highway (Long Newnton, Wiltshire, cf S 1038) and 15 near Tetbury, Gloucestershire	Latin, Malmesbury	Æthelred (of Mercia)
74			A.D. 682	Æthelred, king of Mercia	the church of St Peter, Gloucester	Grant of privileges.	English, Gloucester, St Peter's	Æthelred (of Mercia)
75	77		A.D. 692	Æthelred, king of Mercia	Oslaf, his former minister and now a servant of God at Worcester	Grant of 10 hides (manentes) at Wychbold, Worcestershire	Latin, Worcester	Æthelred (of Mercia)
76	76		A.D. 697 x 699	Æthelred, king	Oftfor, bishop	Grant of 44 hides (cassati) at Fladbury, Worcestershire, so that monastic life may be re-established there.	Latin, Worcester	Æthelred (of Mercia)
77	75		A.D. 691 x 699	Æthelred, king of Mercia	Oftfor, bishop, and St Peter's Church, Worcester	Grant of 30 hides (cassati) at Henbury and Aust, Gloucestershire	Latin, Worcester	Æthelred (of Mercia)
78	120		A.D. 708	Cenred, king of Mercia	Ecgwine, bishop of the Hwicce, for his church at Cronuchomme (Evesham)	Grant of 5 hides (cassati) at Abbots Morton, Worcestershire	Latin with English bounds, Evesham	Cenred (of Mercia)
79	124		A.D. 709	Cenred, king of Mercia	Ecgwine, bishop	Grant, for life, of 12 agri at Oldberrow, Warwickshire, with reversion to St Mary's Minster at Evesham. Bounds prefixed by a statement that Berhtwulf, king (of Mercia), gave the land to Evesham (A.D. 840 x 852).	Latin with English bounds, Evesham	Cenred (of Mercia)
80	125		A.D. 709	Cenred, king of Mercia, and Offa, ruler of the East Angles	the monastery at Evesham	Confirmation of 67 hides (mansae) at Evesham, Lenchwick, Norton, Offenham, Littleton, Aldington, Badsey, Bretforton, Church Honeybourne, Willersey, Wickhamford, Bengeworth, Hampton, and at Abbots Morton, all in Worcestershire except Willersey, Gloucestershire	Latin with bounds, Evesham	Cenred (of Mercia)
81	127		A.D. 710		the church of St Mary, Evesham	Grant of 35 hides (cassati) at Ragley, Arrow, Exhall, Wiveleshale, Atherstone, Dorsington, Broom in Bidford, Milcote, Temple Grafton, Binton, Bidford and Hillborough in Temple Grafton, all in Warwickshire	Latin, Evesham	Ceolred (of Mercia)
82	135		A.D. 716			Æthelbald, king of Mercia, founds a monastery at Crowland, Lincolnshire	Latin with bounds, Crowland	Æthelbald (of Mercia)
83	134		A.D. 716	Æthelbald, king of Mercia	the church of St Mary, Evesham	Grant of 25 hides (mansae) at Acton Beauchamp, Herefordshire; Bransford, Hampton Lovett near Droitwich, Upton Warren, Witton in Droitwich, Sheriffs Lench, Worcestershire; at Weston-on-Avon, Warwickshire; and at Hidcote and Larkstoke in Admington, Gloucestershire	Latin, Evesham	Æthelbald (of Mercia)
84	139		A.D. 718 (? for 727)	Æthelbald, king of Mercia	Bægia, servant of God	Grant of 6 hides (cassati) at Daylesford, Gloucestershire, for the founding of a minster.	Latin with bounds in Latin and English, Worcester	Æthelbald (of Mercia)
85	146		A.D. 718 (? for 727)	Æthelbald, king of Mercia	Buca, his comes	Grant of 3 hides (manentes) at Acton Beauchamp, Herefordshire, to be a perpetual dwelling for the servants of God.	Latin, Evesham	Æthelbald (of Mercia)
86	149		A.D. 716/17 for ? circa 733 (29 October)	Æthelbald, king of Mercia	Mildrith, abbess, and her familia in Minster-in-Thanet	Remission of the toll due on one ship at London.	Latin, Canterbury, St Augustine's (ex Minster-in-Thanet)	Æthelbald (of Mercia)
87	150		A.D. 737 for ? 716/17 (29 October)	Æthelbald, king of Mercia	Mildrith, abbess, and her church	Remission of the toll due on one ship.	Latin, Canterbury, St Augustine's (ex Minster-in-Thanet)	Æthelbald (of Mercia)
88	152		A.D. 733 (1 or 24 September)	Æthelbald, king of Mercia	Ealdwulf, bishop, and the church of St Andrew (Rochester)	Remission of the toll due on one ship at London; with confirmation (A.D. 844 x 851, Werburgewic) by Berhtwulf, king of Mercia.	Latin, Rochester	Æthelbald (of Mercia)
89	154		A.D. 736	Æthelbald, king of the Mercians and of the South Angli	Cyneberht, comes	Grant of 10 hides (cassati) at Ismere by the river Stour and land at Brochyl in Morfe forest, Worcestershire, for the construction of a minster.	Latin with bounds, Worcester	Æthelbald (of Mercia)
90	162		A.D. 742 (Clofeshos)	Æthelbald, king of Mercia	the Kentish churches	Confirmation of privileges.	Latin, Canterbury, Christ Church	Æthelbald (of Mercia)
91	177		A.D. 748 (London, May)	Æthelbald, king of Mercia	Eadburga, abbess, and her familia in the minsters of St Mary and SS Peter and Paul, Thanet	Remission of half the toll due on a ship (? at London).	Latin, Canterbury, St Augustine's (ex Minster-in-Thanet)	Æthelbald (of Mercia)
92	140		A.D. 749 (Gumley, Leics)			Æthelbald, king of Mercia, in favour of the minsters and churches (of Mercia), grant of privileges.	Latin, Canterbury, Christ Church, Crowland and Malmesbury	Æthelbald (of Mercia)
93	155		A.D. 726 x 737	Æthelbald, king	St Mary's Minster, Abingdon	Confirmation of lands and grant of 27 hides (cassati) at Watchfield and 10 by Ginge Brook, Berkshire, with further confirmation by Æthelheard, king (of Wessex).	Latin, Abingdon	Æthelbald (of Mercia)
94	157		A.D. 716 x 737	Æthelbald, king of Mercia and of the South Angles	Æthelric, comes	Grant of 20 hides (cassati) in regione ... Stoppingas at Wootton, Warwickshire	Latin, Worcester	Æthelbald (of Mercia)
95	153		A.D. 723 x 737 (24 November)	Æthelbald, king of Mercia	Cyneburg	Grant of 6 hides (cassati) at Bradley near Inkberrow, Worcestershire	Latin, Worcester	Æthelbald (of Mercia)
96	181		A.D. 757	Æthelbald, king of Mercia	Eanberht, abbot	Grant of 10 hides (cassati) near the wood called Toccan sceaga (Tockenham, Wiltshire) and the tumulus called Reada beorg.	Latin, uncertain (possibly Malmesbury)	Æthelbald (of Mercia)
97	138		A.D. 716 x 717	Æthelbald, king	the church of St Mary, Evesham	Grant of part of a mansio in Droitwich, Worcestershire	Latin, Evesham	Æthelbald (of Mercia)
98	171		? A.D. 743 x 745	Æthelbald, king of Mercia	Milred, bishop, and St Peter's Minster, Worcester	Remission of the toll due on two ships at London.	English, Worcester	Æthelbald (of Mercia)
99	165		A.D. 743 for 737 x 740 (Bearuwe)	Æthelbald, king of Mercia	Osred, his faithful minister	Grant of 20 hides (cassati) at Aston Blank and Notgrove, Gloucestershire, with note that the land was later granted to St Mary's, Worcester.	Latin with English bounds, Worcester	Æthelbald (of Mercia)
100	182		A.D. 716 x 757	Æthelbald, king of Mercia	Wihtred, his comes, and to Ansith, Wihtred's wife	Grant of 7 hides (manentes) in the regio called Geddinges (cf. Yeading), Middlesex	Latin with bounds, Canterbury, Christ Church	Æthelbald (of Mercia)
101	163		A.D. 727 x 736	Æthelbald, king of the South Angles	Wilfrid, bishop (of Worcester)	Grant of 8 hides (manentes) at Batsford, Gloucestershire	Latin with bounds, Worcester	Æthelbald (of Mercia)
102	137		A.D. 716 x 717	Æthelbald, king of Mercia	the church of Worcester	Grant of land south of the river Salwarp, Worcestershire, at Lootwic and Coolbeorg, for the construction of salt works, in exchange for salt works north of the same river.	Latin, Worcester	Æthelbald (of Mercia)
103	164		A.D. 716 x 745	Æthelbald, king of the South Angles	the church of St Peter, Worcester	Grant of 3 hides (cassati) of woodland at Woodchester, Gloucestershire	Latin with bounds, Worcester	Æthelbald (of Mercia)
103a			A.D. 716 x 745	Æthelbald, king of Mercia	Ingwald, bishop of London	Grant of toll from one ship.	Latin, London, St Paul's	Æthelbald (of Mercia)
103b			A.D. 716 x 745	Æthelbald, king of Mercia	Ingwald, bishop of London	Grant of the toll on one ship.	Latin, London, St Paul's	Æthelbald (of Mercia)
104	216		A.D. 759 for 777 x circa 781	Offa, king of the English	the church of St Peter, Worcester	Grant of 40 hides (cassati) at Readanoran (Pyrton, Oxfordshire).	Latin with English bounds, Worcester	Offa (of Mercia)
105	195		A.D. 764 (Canterbury)	Offa, king of Mercia	Eardwulf, bishop of Rochester	Grant of 20 sulungs (aratra) at Islingham, Kent.	Latin, Rochester	Offa (of Mercia)
106	201		A.D. 764 for 767	Offa, king of Mercia	Stithberht, abbot	Grant of 30 hides (manentes) between Harrow and the Lidding (Wealdstone Brook) and east of the Lidding, Middlesex, in exchange for 30 hides at Wicham in Ciltinne.	Latin, Canterbury, Christ Church	Offa (of Mercia)
107	221		A.D. 765 (2 Feb)	Offa, king of Mercia	Milred, bishop of the Hwicce	Grant of 10 hides (manentia) at Pyrton, Oxfordshire	Latin, Worcester	Offa (of Mercia)
108	208		A.D. 772 (15 August)	Offa, king of the English	Oswald, bishop	Grant, for the foundation of a minster, of 8 hides (cassati) at Bexhill, Sussex, with reversion to the bishopric of Selsey. With a list of gavel-land appurtenant to Bexhill, namely, Barnhorne, Worsham, on Ibbanhyrste, Crowhurst, on Hricge, on Gyllingan, Foxham (lost, in Crowhurst), on Blacanbrocan (? Black Brooks in Westfield), and Icklesham, all in Sussex.	Latin with English bounds, Canterbury, Christ Church (? ex Selsey)	Offa (of Mercia)
109	209		A.D. 772 ? for 775 or 777 (Gumley, Leics)	Offa, king of the English	Ridda, minister	Lease, for the lives of himself, his wife, Bucga, and their daughter, Heaburg, of 8 hides (manentes) at Evenlode, Gloucestershire, with reversion to the minster at Bredon, Worcestershire	Latin with bounds, Worcester	Offa (of Mercia)
110	213		A.D. 774	Offa, king of the English	Jænberht, archbishop	Grant of 5 sulungs (aratra) at Higham Upshire, Kent.	Latin with bounds, Canterbury, Christ Church	Offa (of Mercia)
111	214		A.D. 774	Offa, king of the English	Jænberht, archbishop	Grant of 3 sulungs (aratra) at Lydd, Kent.	Latin with bounds, Canterbury, Christ Church	Offa (of Mercia)
112	222		A.D. 777	Offa, king of Mercia	the church of St Mary, Evesham, and the monks there	Grant of land at Daylesford, Evenlode, Gloucestershire, and at Chastleton, Cornwell, Salford, Dornford in Wootton and Shipton on Cherwell, Oxfordshire	Latin, Evesham	Offa (of Mercia)
113	223		A.D. 778	Offa, king of Mercia	his subregulus, Ealdred, dux of the Hwicce	Grant of 4 hides (mansiones) at Sedgeberrow, Worcestershire, with grant by Ealdred to the church of St Mary's, Worcester.	Latin with bounds, Worcester	Offa (of Mercia)
114	230		A.D. 779 (Hartleford, Gloucs; Gumley, Leics)	Offa, king of Mercia	Duddonus (Dudda), minister	Grant of 4 hides (cassatae) near Salmonsbury in Bourton-on-the-Water, Gloucestershire	Latin with bounds, Evesham	Offa (of Mercia)
115	229		A.D. 779	Offa, king of Mercia	St Mary's, Evesham	Grant of 4 hides (manentes) at Donnington, Gloucestershire	Latin with English bounds, Evesham	Offa (of Mercia)
116	236		A.D. 780 (Brentford, Middx, 22 Sept)	Offa, king of Mercia	St Peter's Minster, Bredon	Grant of 5 hides (manentes) at Teddington, 10 hides (cassati) at Little Washbourne, 10 hides (mansiones) at Cutsdean, all in Gloucestershire, and 10 hides (manentes) at Bredons Norton, Worcestershire	Latin, Worcester	Offa (of Mercia)
117	234		A.D. 780	Offa, king of Mercia	the church of St Peter, Bredon, for the use of the bishop of Worcester	Grant of 10 hides (manentes) at Wærsetfelda (cf. Wast Hills in Alvechurch), 5 hides (cassati) at Cofton Hackett and 5 hides (mansae) at Rednal in Kings Norton, Worcestershire	Latin, Worcester	Offa (of Mercia)
118	235		A.D. 780 (Brentford, Middx, 22 Sept)	Offa, king of Mercia	the bishopric of Worcester	Grant of 7 hides (manentes) at Cropthorne, 1 at Netherton, 2 at Elmley Castle, 1 at Kersoe in Elmley Castle, 14 at Charlton, 15 at Hampton and 10 at Bengeworth, Worcestershire	Latin, Worcester	Offa (of Mercia)
119			A.D. 781	Offa, king of Mercia	Ealdred (Aeldred), his minister	Grant of 20 hides (mansae) at Harmondsworth, Middlesex, in return for 100 mancuses of gold in a bracelet.	Latin with bounds, probably Westminster	Offa (of Mercia)
120	239		A.D. 781 = 780 (Tamworth, Staffs, 26 Decirca)	Offa, king of Mercia	the church of St Peter, Worcester	Grant of privileges for 12 hides (manentes) at Hampton Lucy, Warwickshire, and 5 at Fæhha leage, leased by Bishop Heathored and the community of Worcester to Eanburh, abbess, Offa's kinswoman, for life.	Latin, Worcester	Offa (of Mercia)
121	240		A.D. 781 = 780 (Tamworth, Staffs, 26 Decirca)	Offa, king of Mercia	the church of St Mary, Worcester	Grant of 8 hides (cassati) at Icomb, Gloucestershire, in exchange for land at Sapey, Worcestershire	Latin with bounds, Worcester	Offa (of Mercia)
122	244		A.D. 784	Offa. king of Mercia	Esme (Esne), comes and præfectus	Grant, to him and his male heirs, of 3 hides (tributarii) at Evenlode, with reversion to the church at Evesham.	Latin, Evesham	Offa (of Mercia)
123	247		A.D. 785 (Chelsea, Middx)	Offa, king of Mercia	Ealdbeorht, minister, and Selethryth, his sister	Grant of 14 sulungs (aratra) at Ickham and Palmstead, Kent, with woodland in the Weald and other appurtenances.	Latin, Canterbury, Christ Church	Offa (of Mercia)
124	245		A.D. 785	Offa, king of Mercia	St Peter's, Westminster	Grant of 10 hides (cassati) at Aldenham, Hertfordshire, in return for 100 mancuses of gold in a bracelet.	Latin with English bounds, Westminster	Offa (of Mercia)
125	248		A.D. 786 (Chelsea, Middx)	Offa, king of Mercia	Ealdbeorht, minister, and his sister, Selethryth, abbess	Grant of 15 sulungs (aratra) at Ickham, Palmstead and Ruckinge, Kent, with swine-pastures, woodland and other appurtenances, including an urban tenement (vicus) at Curringtun in Canterbury.	Latin with English, Canterbury, Christ Church	Offa (of Mercia)
126	233		A.D. 786 or 589 for ? 779 or 789 x 790	Offa, king of Mercia	the monks of St Mary's church, Worcester	Grant of one hide (mansa) at Broadwas, Worcestershire	Latin and English versions with English bounds, Worcester	Offa (of Mercia)
127	251		A.D. 787 (Acleah)	Offa, king of Mercia	Ceolnoth, abbot, and his familia in the church of St Peter (Chertsey)	Confirmation of privileges.	Latin, Chertsey	Offa (of Mercia)
128	254		A.D. 788 (Chelsea, Middx)	Offa, king of Mercia	Osberht, his minister, and Osberht's wife	Grant of 1 sulung (aratrum) at Duningcland in the Eastry district, Kent.	Latin, Canterbury, Christ Church	Offa (of Mercia)
129	253		A.D. 788	Offa, king of Mercia	St Andrew's church, and the bishopric of Rochester	Grant of 6 sulungs (aratra) at Trottiscliffe, Kent, with swine-pastures in the Weald.	Latin with bounds, Rochester	Offa (of Mercia)
130	257		A.D. 789	Offa, king of Mercia	Wærmund, bishop, and the church at Rochester	Grant of 1 sulung (aratrum) at Bromhey in Frindsbury, Kent.	Latin with bounds, Rochester	Offa (of Mercia)
131	255		A.D. 789 (Chelsea, Middx)	Offa, king of Mercia	Wærmund, bishop	Grant of land at Rochester, Kent.	Latin with bounds, Rochester	Offa (of Mercia)
132	265		A.D. 790 for ? 795 (London)	Offa, king of the English	Æthelheard, archbishop of Canterbury	Grant of 60 hides (tributaria) at Hayes and Yeading and 30 at Twickenham, Middlesex	Latin, Canterbury, Christ Church	Offa (of Mercia)
133	259		A.D. 790 (Tamworth, Staffs, 12 April)	Offa, king of Mercia	the abbey of Saint-Denis	Grant of privileges for land at London, and confirmation of land at Rotherfield, Hastings and Pevensey, Sussex.	Latin, Paris, Saint-Denis	Offa (of Mercia)
134	848		A.D. 792 (Clofesho)	Offa, king of Mercia	the churches of Kent	Confirmation and grant of privileges.	Latin, Canterbury, St Augustine's	Offa (of Mercia)
135	268		A.D. 793	Offa, king of Mercia	Crowland Abbey	Grant of privileges.	Latin, Crowland	Offa (of Mercia)
136	267		A.D. 793	Offa, king of Mercia	the church of St Alban	Grant of privileges and of 34 hides (mansiones) at Cassio, Hertfordshire, 6 at Heanhamstede (cf. Hamstead's House, St Stephens, Hertfordshire) and 10 at Stanmore, Middlesex	Latin with English and English bounds, St Albans	Offa (of Mercia)
136a			A.D. 793	Offa, king of Mercia	St Albans Abbey	Grant of privileges and of 34 hides at Cassio, Hertfordshire; 12 at Winslow, Buckinghamshire; 10 at Fenntune with the wood called Horowudu (Horwood, Buckinghamshire), 5 at Ligtune (? Luton, Bedfordshire), 3 at Scylfdune, 10 at Stanmore, Middlesex, and 6 at Heanhamstede (cf. Hamstead's House, St Stephens, Hertfordshire).	English, St Albans	Offa (of Mercia)
137	269		A.D. 794 (Clofeshoas)			Record of the restoration by Offa, king, to Heathored, bishop of Worcester; of 5 hides (manentes) at Aust (Cliff), Gloucestershire, seized by Bynna, the king's comes, the bishop having brought forward a charter of King Æthelbald to prove the bishopric's title.	Latin, Worcester	Offa (of Mercia)
138	264		A.D. 795 for 792 (Æt Beranforda [? Barford, Warwicks], 4 May)	Offa, king of Mercia	St Albans church	Grant of 30 hides (manentes), consisting of 12 at Winslow, Buckinghamshire; 3 at Scelfdune sive Baldiningcotum; 10 at Scuccan hlaw vel Fenntun (cf. Warren Farm in Horwood, Buckinghamshire) with the wood called Horowudu (Horwood, Buckinghamshire); and 5 at Lygetune (? Luton, Bedfordshire, or Leyton, Essex).	Latin with English bounds, St Albans	Offa (of Mercia)
139	274		A.D. 793 x 796 (Clobeshoas)		Æthelmund, his minister	Grant of 55 hides (cassati) at Westbury-on-Trym, Gloucestershire	Latin, Worcester	Offa (of Mercia)
140	207		A.D. 765 x 792	Offa, king of Mercia	Æthelnoth, abbot of SS Peter and Paul (St Augustine's, Canterbury)	Grant of 2 hides (manentes) at Beauxfield, Kent, with grazing rights in the wood called Singledge.	Latin with English bounds, Canterbury, St Augustine's	Offa (of Mercia)
141	246		A.D. 777 x 779	Offa, king of Mercia, with Ealdred, subregulus of the Hwicce	the minster and church of St Michael at Bishops Cleeve, Gloucs.	Grant of 15 hides (mansiones) at Timbingctun, under Wendlesclif and north of Tyrl brook. Bounds of Wendlesclif.	Latin with English bounds, Worcester	Offa (of Mercia)
142	219		A.D. 757 x 774		Milred, bishop	Grant of land at Wick Episcopi, Worcestershire	Latin with bounds in Latin and English, Worcester	Offa (of Mercia)
143	188		A.D. 761 x 764	Offa, king of Mercia	Sigeburga, abbess	Confirmation of the exemption from ship-toll which King Æthelbald granted to Abbess Mildred (S 87).	Latin, Canterbury, St Augustine's	Offa (of Mercia)
144	275		A.D. 757 x 796 (Freoricburna, Surrey)	Offa, king of Mercia	the church at Woking, Surrey	Grant of 20 hides (manentes) at Woking.	Latin, Peterborough	Offa (of Mercia)
145	226		A.D. 777	Offa, king of the English	St Mary's minster, Worcester	Grant of 5 hides (manentes) at Doughton in Tetbury, Gloucestershire, and 5 at Eisey in Latton, Wiltshire	Latin with English bounds, Worcester	Offa (of Mercia)
146	272		A.D. 793 x 796		(the church at) Worcester	Grant of reversion of 60 hides (manentes) at Westbury-on-Trym and 10 (or 20) at Henbury, Gloucestershire, after the death of himself and his son Ecgfrith.	Latin with English bounds, Worcester	Offa (of Mercia)
147	231		A.D. 777 x 779	Offa, king of Mercia, with Ealdred, subregulus of the Hwicce	St Mary's Minster, Worcester	Grant of 10 hides (mansiones) at Yate, Gloucestershire	Latin, Worcester	Offa (of Mercia)
148	277		A.D. 796 (Bath, Somerset)	Ecgfrith, king of Mercia	Æthelmund, his princeps	Grant of 3 hides (cassati) at Huntena tun.	Latin, Worcester	Ecgfrith (of Mercia)
149	279		A.D. 796	Ecgfrith, king of Mercia	Cuthbert, abbot, and the brethren of Malmesbury Abbey	Restitution of 35 hides (manentes) at Purton, Wiltshire, previously seized by King Offa, in return for 2000 silver solidi.	Latin, Malmesbury	Ecgfrith (of Mercia)
150	281		A.D. 796 (Chelsea, Middx)	Ecgfrith, king of Mercia	St Albans Abbey	Grant of 10 hides (manentes) at Turville, Buckinghamshire	Latin, St Albans	Ecgfrith (of Mercia)
151	280		A.D. 796 (Chelsea, Middx)	Ecgfrith, king of Mercia	Willegoda, abbot, and St Albans Abbey	Grant of 5 hides (manentes) at Pinnelesfeld (Pinesfield Farm in Rickmansworth, Hertfordshire).	Latin with English bounds, St Albans	Ecgfrith (of Mercia)
152	285		A.D. 797 (Glastonbury)	Coenwulf, king of Mercia	Cynehelm and his successors	Confirmation of the freedom of Glastonbury Abbey, previously granted by King Ecgfrith.	Latin, Glastonbury	Cenwulf (of Mercia)
153	289		A.D. 798	(a) Coenwulf, king of Mercia	Oswulf, his dux and minister	Grant of land at Hremping wiic, also known as Hafingseota, south of the river Limen, Kent, in exchange for land at Bobingseata. (b) Oswulf grants the land to Lyminge minster.	Latin, Canterbury, Christ Church (ex Lyminge)	Cenwulf (of Mercia)
154	295		A.D. 799 (? for 802) (Coleshill, Warwicks)		Balthun, abbot	Grant of 30 hides (manentes) belonging to Kempsey minster, Worcestershire, in exchange for 12 hides at Harvington, Worcestershire	Latin, Worcester	Cenwulf (of Mercia)
155	293		A.D. 799 (Tamworth, Staffs)	Coenwulf, king of Mercia	Christ Church, Canterbury	Restoration of 30 sulungs (aratra) at Charing, 10 at Seleberhtes cert or Bryning lond (Chart) and 4 at Humbinglond in Barham, Kent, previously seized and redistributed by King Offa.	Latin, Canterbury, Christ Church	Cenwulf (of Mercia)
156	296		A.D. 799 (17 July)		Christ Church, Canterbury	Grant of 4 sulungs (aratra) at Giddinge and Wootton, Kent.	Latin with bounds, Canterbury, Christ Church	Cenwulf (of Mercia)
157	303		A.D. 801	Coenwulf, king of Mercia, and Cuthred, king of Kent	Swithhun, minister	Grant of 3 sulungs (aratra) at Bromhey in Frindsbury, Kent, one sulung at Æthilwlfing lond, a fishery on the Thames called Fiscnæs, and swine-pastures in Cæstersæta walda, with confirmation by Cuthred (2nd day of Easter, Canterbury) and note of bequest of the land by Swithhun to St Andrew's, Rochester, Kent.	Latin, Rochester	Cenwulf (of Mercia)
158	302		A.D. 801 (Chelsea, Middx)	Coenwulf, king of Mercia	Bishop Wehthun and the church at Selsey	Confirmation of 25 (hides) at Denton, Sussex.	Latin, Selsey	Cenwulf (of Mercia)
159	316		A.D. 804	Coenwulf, king of Mercia, and Cuthred, king of Kent	[Eanberht], their kinsman	Grant of 20 sulungs (aratra) at West Lenham, Kent, with thirteen swine-pastures in the Weald.	Latin, Canterbury, St Augustine's	Cenwulf (of Mercia)
160	317		A.D. 804	Coenwulf, king of Mercia, and Cuthred, king of Kent	Selethryth, abbess, and her familia at Lyminge	Grant of land in Canterbury to serve as a refuge.	Latin, Canterbury, Christ Church (ex Lyminge)	Cenwulf (of Mercia)
161	321		A.D. 805 (Acleah)	Coenwulf, king of Mercia, and Cuthred, king of Kent	Wulfhard, priest	Grant of 2 hides (manentes), equivalent to one sulung, at Swarling, Kent, and one 'yokelet' (an geocled) at Ecgheanng lond.	Latin, Canterbury, Christ Church	Cenwulf (of Mercia)
162	325		A.D. 806	Coenwulf, king of Mercia	Crowland Abbey	Grant of privileges and confirmation of grant of alms in Bucknall, Hallington, Langtoft, Baston and Rippingale, Lincolnshire	Latin, Crowland	Cenwulf (of Mercia)
163	326		A.D. 808 (Tamworth, Staffs, Easter Day, 16 April)	Coenwulf, king of Mercia	Eadwulf, minister	Grant of 1.5 sulungs (aratra) at Cooling, Kent.	Latin with bounds, Canterbury, Christ Church	Cenwulf (of Mercia)
164	328		A.D. 809 (Croydon, Staffs)	Coenwulf, king of Mercia and Kent	Wulfred, archbishop	Grant of 7 sulungs (aratra) at Barham, Kent, in return for 30 pounds. Confirmed at Canterbury in A.D. 810.	Latin with bounds, Canterbury, Christ Church	Cenwulf (of Mercia)
165	339		A.D. 811	Coenwulf, king of Mercia	Beornmod, bishop	Grant of 3 sulungs (aratra) to the south of Rochester (at Borstal), Kent, with appurtenant swine-pastures in the Weald.	Latin with bounds, Rochester	Cenwulf (of Mercia)
166	352		A.D. 811	Coenwulf, king of Mercia	Rethun, abbot of Abingdon	Grant of 10 hides (manentes) at Longworth, Berkshire, and 18 hides at Aclea, Northtuna and Punningstoce, with the restitution of 15 hides at Sunningwell, 10 hides at Eaton, 10 hides at Sandforda (probably Dry Sandford), 30 hides at Denchworth and Goosey, land at Culham, 10 hides at Ginge and 10 at Leckhampstead (all Berkshire, except Culham, Oxfordshire), in return for 120 pounds and 100 hides (mansiones).	Latin, Abingdon	Cenwulf (of Mercia)
167	338		A.D. 811 (9 November)			Founds Winchcombe Abbey.	Latin, Winchcombe	Cenwulf (of Mercia)
168	335		A.D. 811 (London, 1 August)	Coenwulf, king of Mercia	Wulfred, archbishop	Grant of 2 sulungs (aratra) at Appincg lond in Rainham, 2 sulungs at Suithhunincg lond at Graveney near Faversham, and 2.5 hagae in Canterbury, all in Kent, in return for 126 mancuses.	Latin with bounds, Canterbury, Christ Church	Cenwulf (of Mercia)
169	341		A.D. 812	Coenwulf, king of Mercia	Wulfred, archbishop	Grant of 1 sulung (aratrum) at Graveney and a 'yokelet' (ioclet) at Caseborne (lost) in Cheriton, Kent, in exchange for 1 sulung (equivalent to 2 manentes) at Swarling, Kent, and a 'yokelet' at Ecgheang lond.	Latin with bounds, Canterbury, Christ Church	Cenwulf (of Mercia)
170	340		A.D. 812 (London, 31 October)	Coenwulf, king of Mercia	Wulfred, archbishop	Grant of 20 iugera at Ibentea in the Faversham district and a further 2 in the same area.	Latin, Canterbury, Christ Church	Cenwulf (of Mercia)
171	351		A.D. 814 (Tamworth, Staffs)	Coenwulf, king of Mercia	Deneberht, bishop, and his familia at Worcester	Grant of 8 hides (manentes) at Sture, in exchange for 12 hides at Guiting, Gloucestershire	Latin, Worcester	Cenwulf (of Mercia)
172	350		A.D. 814 = 813 (Tamworth, Staffs, 26 December)	Coenwulf, king of Mercia	Deneberht, bishop, and his familia at Worcester	Remission of renders due from Worcester and its dependent minsters, in exchange for the minster at Twyning, Gloucestershire, assessed at 3 hides (manentes), and 10 hides west of the Severn.	Latin, Worcester	Cenwulf (of Mercia)
173	343		A.D. 814	Coenwulf, king of Mercia	Swithnoth, his comes	Grant of 1 sulung (aratrum) near Chart Sutton, Kent, with swine-pastures.	Latin, Worcester	Cenwulf (of Mercia)
174	349		A.D. 814 = 813 (26 December)	Coenwulf, king of Mercia	the church of Worcester	Grant of 1 hide (cassata) at Dunhampstead in Himbleton, Worcestershire	Latin with English bounds, Worcester	Cenwulf (of Mercia)
175	346		A.D. 814	Coenwulf, king of Mercia	Wulfred, archbishop	Grant of 10 sulungs (aratra) at Bexley, Kent, with swine-pastures.	Latin with English bounds, Canterbury, Christ Church	Cenwulf (of Mercia)
176	344		A.D. 814	Coenwulf, king of Mercia	Wulfred, archbishop	Grant of 30 iugera at Bingley's Island, Canterbury.	Latin, Canterbury, Christ Church	Cenwulf (of Mercia)
177	348		A.D. 814 (Bearwe, 25 November)	Coenwulf, king of Mercia	Wulfred, archbishop	Grant of one sulung (aratrum) at Cynincges cua lond, Kent (? Kingsland (lost) in Faversham hundred), in return for 7 pounds of gold and silver.	Latin with bounds, Canterbury, Christ Church	Cenwulf (of Mercia)
178	353		A.D. 815 (Wychbold, Worcs, 19 March)	Coenwulf, king of Mercia	Wulfred, archbishop	Grant of 1 hide (manens) at Seleberhting lond in the district of Faversham, Kent, in return for a ring of 23 mancuses.	Latin with bounds, Canterbury, Christ Church	Cenwulf (of Mercia)
179	356		A.D. 816	Coenwulf, king of Mercia	Deneberht, bishop, and his clergy at Worcester	Grant of privileges for land at Hallow, Spetchley, Himbleton, Ravenshill in Tibberton, Worcestershire; Lapworth, Warwickshire; and at Oddingley and Chaddesley Corbett, Worcestershire Bounds of Hallow inserted.	Latin with English bounds, Worcester	Cenwulf (of Mercia)
180	357		A.D. 816	Coenwulf, king of Mercia	Deneberht, bishop, and his clergy at Worcester	Grant of privileges for land at Whittington, Spetchley and Tolladine in North Claines, for 30 hides (manentes) at Weogorena-leage (Hallow), and for 25 hides at Chaddesley Corbett, Worcestershire, in return for 14 hides at Sture.	Latin with bounds, Worcester	Cenwulf (of Mercia)
181	360		A.D. 817	Coenwulf, king of Mercia	Deneberht, bishop, and his cathedral clergy at Worcester	Grant of privileges for land at Salwarpe, Hampton Lovett, Beolne (Bell Hall in Belbroughton), Broughton and Fairfield in Belbroughton, Worcestershire	Latin, Worcester	Cenwulf (of Mercia)
182	359		A.D. 817	Coenwulf, king of Mercia	Deneberht, bishop, and the church of Worcester	Grant of 3 hides (mansiones) at Sluhforda on the west bank of the Stour, Worcestershire	Latin, Worcester	Cenwulf (of Mercia)
183	366		A.D. 821	Coenwulf, king of Mercia	Abingdon Abbey	Grant of privileges for land at Culham, Oxfordshire; Kennington, Hinksey, Cumnor, Earmundelæh (cf. Bessels Leigh), Eaton, Sunningwell, Dry Sandford, Wootton, Ginge, Denchworth, Charney (Bassett), Goosey, Fernham, Watchfield, Shrivenham, Bourton, Leckhampstead, Boxford, Welford and Wickham in Welford, Berkshire, with woodland at Speen, Poughley (in Chaddleworth), Trindlæh (lost), and Easton (in Welford), Berkshire	Latin, Abingdon	Cenwulf (of Mercia)
184			A.D. 821	Coenwulf, king of Mercia	Abingdon Abbey	Grant of 15 hides (mansae) at Culham, Oxfordshire, with pasture at Otney (near Sutton Courtenay), Berkshire	Latin, Abingdon	Cenwulf (of Mercia)
185	368		A.D. 798 x 821, probably 814	Coenwulf, king of Mercia	Deneberht, bishop, and his familia at Worcester	Grant of the reversion of 30 hides (tributarii) at Fladbury, Worcestershire, after his own death.	Latin, Worcester	Cenwulf (of Mercia)
186	370		A.D. 822 (Bydictun, 17 September)	Ceolwulf, king of Mercia and Kent	Wulfred, archbishop	Grant of 5 sulungs (aratra) at Mylentun, near Kemsing, Kent, in return for a gold ring worth 75 mancuses.	Latin with bounds, Canterbury, Christ Church	Ceolwulf (of Mercia)
187	373		A.D. 823 (Werburgingwic, 26 May)	Ceolwulf, king of Mercia and Kent	Wulfred, archbishop	Grant of land in Canterbury, in return for a gold and silver vessel of 5.5 pounds.	Latin with bounds, Canterbury, Christ Church	Ceolwulf (of Mercia)
188	400		A.D. 831 (Wychbold, Worcs)	Wiglaf, king of Mercia	Wulfred, archbishop	Grant of 5 hides (cassati) at Botwell in Hayes, Middlesex	Latin with bounds, Canterbury, Christ Church	Wiglaf (of Mercia)
189	409		A.D. 833	Wiglaf, king of Mercia	Siward, abbot of Crowland, and the abbey of Crowland	Confirmation and grant of privileges and of land at Bucknall, Hallington, Gernthorp, Langtoft, Deeping, Baston, Rippingale, Lincolnshire; Sutton, Stapleton, Leicestershire, Badby, Northamptonshire; Holbeach, Whaplode, Spalding, Drayton, Lincolnshire; Glapthorn, Peakirk, Northamptonshire; Laythorpe, Kirkby, Lincolnshire; Standon, Hertfordshire; and at Addington, Northamptonshire	Latin with bounds, Crowland	Wiglaf (of Mercia)
190	416		A.D. 836 (Croft, Leics)	Wiglaf, king of Mercia	the minster at Hanbury, Worcs.	Grant of privileges in return for the surrender to the king of 20 hides at Iddeshale (? Idsall, Shropshire.), land at Hæccaham (? Hanbury, Worcestershire), 10 hides at Felda by Weoduman (? in Beanhall in Feckenham, Worcestershire), and in return for the grant of 10 hides at Crowle, Worcestershire, to Mucel (ealdorman), son of Esne, and a gift of 600 shillings in gold to Ealdorman Sigered.	Latin with English, Worcester	Wiglaf (of Mercia)
191	453		A.D. 840 for circa 844 x 852	Berhtwulf, king of Mercia	the church of St Mary, Evesham	Grant of 10 hides (mansae) at Quinton, Warwickshire; 2 at Pebworth, Worcestershire; and 5 at Mappleborough in Studley, Warwickshire	Latin, Evesham	Berhtwulf (of Mercia)
192	430		A.D. 840 (Tamworth, Staffs, Easter; Wellesbourne, Warwicks)	Berhtwulf, king of Mercia	Heahberht, bishop of Worcester	Restitution of land at Stoulton, Worcestershire; Little Washbourne, Gloucestershire; Kemerton, Worcestershire; Tateringctun (? Taddington, Gloucestershire); and at Codeswelle in Cutsdean, Gloucestershire, in return for gifts of treasure and horses to the king and queen.	Latin, Worcester	Berhtwulf (of Mercia)
193	434		A.D. 841 = 840 (Tamworth, Staffs, 25 Decirca)	Berhtwulf, king of Mercia	Eanmund, abbot of Bredon (? Breedon-on-the-Hill, Leics., or Bredon, Worcs.), and his community	Grant of privileges, in return for 120 mancuses of pure gold and liturgical obligations.	Latin, Worcester (ex Bredon, Worcs., or Breedon-on-the-Hill, Leics.)	Berhtwulf (of Mercia)
194	436		A.D. 841 (Tamworth, Staffs)	Berhtwulf, king of Mercia	Heahberht, bishop	Grant of privileges for 6 hides (cassati) at Daylesford, Gloucestershire, in return for 3 pounds of silver.	Latin, Worcester	Berhtwulf (of Mercia)
195	433		A.D. 841 = 840 (Tamworth, Staffs, 25 Decirca)	Berhtwulf, king of Mercia	Heahberht, bishop, for the monks of St Mary's, Worcester	Grant of one hide (mansa) at Mitton in Bredon, Worcestershire	Latin, Worcester	Berhtwulf (of Mercia)
196	432		A.D. 841 = 840 (Cropthorne, Worcs, with confirmation at Tamworth, Staffs, 25 Decirca)	Berhtwulf, king of Mercia	Heahberht, bishop	Grant of 10 hides (manentes) at Wychwood, Oxfordshire, in return for 31 mancuses.	Latin, Worcester	Berhtwulf (of Mercia)
197	454		A.D. 844 for 848 (Repton, Derbys)	Berhtwulf, king of Mercia	Abbot Eanmund and his familia in the minster at Breedon-on-the-Hill, Leics.	Grant of privileges, in return for a gift of 180 mancuses in gold and 15 hides (manentes) at Stanlege (? Stanley, Derbyshire) and at Bellanford (? Belford, Northamptonshire) to the king and also the donation of a precious vessel to Humberht, princeps. L	Latin, Peterborough (ex Breedon-on-the-Hill, Leics.)	Berhtwulf (of Mercia)
198	450		A.D. 845 = 844 (Tamworth, Staffs, Christmas)	Berhtwulf, king of Mercia	Heahberht, abbot, and his familia in Worcester	Grant of exemption for the minster of Ufera Stretford (Stratford upon Avon, Warwickshire), assessed at 20 hides (manentes), in return for 10 pounds of silver.	Latin, Worcester	Berhtwulf (of Mercia)
199	455(2)		A.D. 849 (Tamworth, Staffs)	Berhtwulf, king of Mercia	Egbert, his minister	Lease, for 5 lives, of 5 hides at Cofton Hackett, Worcestershire, granted to the king in S 1272.	Latin, Worcester	Berhtwulf (of Mercia)
200	461		A.D. 851	Berhtwulf, king of Mercia	Siward, abbot of Crowland and the abbey	Confirmation of marshes at Crowland, Spalding and elsewhere, and of land at Langtoft, Deeping, Thetford, Baston, Rippingale, Whaplode, Holbeach, Pinchbeck, Spalding, Sutterton, Algarkirk, Drayton, Lincolnshire; Glapthorn, Peakirk, Northamptonshire; Kirkby, Lincolnshire; Standon, Hertfordshire; Addington, Northamptonshire; Bucknall, Hallington, and at Germuthorp, Lincolnshire	Latin with bounds, Crowland	Berhtwulf (of Mercia)
201	462		A.D. 851	Berhtwulf, king of Mercia	St Mary's church, Worcester	Grant of 3 hides (cassati) at Grimley, Worcestershire	Latin with English bounds, Worcester	Berhtwulf (of Mercia)
202	466		A.D. 852 for 842 (Escantun)	Berhtwulf, king of Mercia	Ælfheah, princeps	Grant of 12 hides (cassati) at Calmesden (or by the River Churn and at Calmesden), Gloucestershire	Latin with English bounds, Abingdon	Berhtwulf (of Mercia)
203	482		A.D. 840 x 852	Berhtwulf, king of the Mercians	St Mary's, Evesham	Grant of 10 hides (manentes) at Willersey, Gloucestershire	Latin with English bounds, Evesham	Berhtwulf (of Mercia)
204	452		A.D. 844 x 845	Berhtwulf, king (of Mercia)	Forthred, his thegn	Grant of 9 hides at Wotton Underwood, Buckinghamshire, in return for 30 mancuses and 900 shillings.	English with bounds, Canterbury, Christ Church	Berhtwulf (of Mercia)
205	428		A.D. 840 x 848	Berhtwulf, king of Mercia	Heahberht, bishop, and his familia at Worcester	Grant of 5 hides (manentes) at Crowle, Worcestershire	Latin, Worcester	Berhtwulf (of Mercia)
206	487		A.D. 855 (Oswaldesdun)	Burgred, king of Mercia	Alhhun, bishop, and his familia at Worcester	Grant of privileges for 10 hides (manentes) at Ablington by the River Coln, Gloucestershire; for 8 hides (cassati) at Poulton, Wiltshire; for 6 hides (cassati) at Barnsley, Gloucestershire; for 5 hides (manentes) at Eisey, Wiltshire; and for 3 hides (manentes) at Bentley, Worcestershire; in return for two bradiolae weighing 45 (or 48) mancuses.	Latin, Worcester	Berhtwulf (of Mercia)
207	488		A.D. 855 (Tamworth, Staffs)	Burgred, king of Mercia	Alhhun (or Alhwine), bishop of Worcester	Grant of privileges for the minster at Blockley, Gloucestershire, in return for 300 silver shillings.	Latin, Worcester	Berhtwulf (of Mercia)
208	492		A.D. 857 (Tamworth, Staffs, Easter)	Burgred, king of Mercia	Alhhun, bishop (of Worcester)	Grant of land at Ceolmundingchaga in London.	Latin, Worcester	Berhtwulf (of Mercia)
209	503		A.D. 862 (Wellesbourne, Warwicks)	Burgred, king of Mercia	the church of St Peter, Gloucester	Confirmation of privileges.	Latin, Gloucester	Berhtwulf (of Mercia)
210	509		A.D. 864 (Bath, Somerset, 25 July)	Burgred, king of Mercia, and Æthelswith, his queen	Alhhun, bishop	Grant of 5 hides (cassati) at (Water) Eaton, Oxfordshire, in return for precious objects worth 400 shillings and 100 sicli, with provision for an annual render of 30 shillings to be paid to the church at Eynsham, Oxfordshire	Latin, Worcester	Berhtwulf (of Mercia)
211	514		A.D. 866	Burgred, king of Mercia	Worcester monastery	Grant of 2 hides (manentes) at Seckley in Upper Arley, also called Wolverley, Worcestershire	Latin with English bounds, Worcester	Berhtwulf (of Mercia)
212	513		A.D. 866	Burgred, king of Mercia	Wulferd	Grant of 2 hides (manentes) at Seckley in Upper Arley, belonging to Wolverley, Worcestershire, in return for 5 hides on a single-lifetime lease, 400 silver sicli and various other items.	Latin with English bounds, Worcester	Berhtwulf (of Mercia)
213	521		A.D. 868	Burgred, king of Mercia	Crowland Abbey	Confirmation of privileges and land etcirca at Crowland, Spalding, Pinchbeck, Whaplode, Sutterton, Algarkirk, Drayton, Deeping, Langtoft, Baston, Thetford, Rippingale, Lincolnshire; Sutton, Leicestershire; Badby, Northamptonshire; Bucknall, Hallington, Lincolnshire; Gerunthrop ; Glapthorn, Peakirk, Northamptonshire; Laythorpe, Kirkby, Lincolnshire; Addington, Northamptonshire; Standon, Hertfordshire; Thurning, Northamptonshire (formerly Huntingdonshire).	Latin, Crowland	Berhtwulf (of Mercia)
214	524		A.D. 869	Burgred, king of Mercia, and Æthelswith, queen	Wulflaf	Grant of 5 hides (manentes) at Upthrop, in return for 50 mancuses of gold. The estate is to descend in the male line.	Latin with English bounds, Canterbury, Christ Church	Berhtwulf (of Mercia)
215	540		A.D. 875	Ceolwulf (II), king of Mercia	Wærferth, bishop of Worcester	Grant to the diocese of exemption from the burden of feeding the king's horses and their servants, in return for liturgical services. The bishop grants to the king a four-life lease of 6 hides (manentes) at Daylesford, Gloucestershire, with reversion to Worcester, in return for 60 mancuses of gold.	Latin, Worcester	Ceolwulf II (of Mercia)
216	541		A.D. 875	Ceolwulf (II), king of Mercia	St Mary's minster, Worcester	Grant of 6 hides (cassati) at Overbury, Worcestershire, with villulae at Conderton and Pendock, Worcestershire Bounds of Overbury.	Latin with English bounds, Worcester	Ceolwulf II (of Mercia)
217	547		A.D. 880 for 887	Æthelred, dux et patricius of Mercia	the bishopric of Worcester	Grant of 6 hides (mansiones) at Brightwell Baldwin and 8 at Watlington, Oxfordshire, to pertain to the church at Readanoran (i.e. Pyrton, Oxon). With a list, in English, of six serfs formerly belonging to the royal vill at Bensington, Oxfordshire	Latin with English bounds, Worcester	Ealdorman (of Mercia)
218	551		A.D. 883	(a) Æthelred, ealdorman of Mercia, with the consent of King Alfred and the whole Mercian witan	Berkeley Abbey	Grant of privileges in exchange for 12 hides at Stoke Bishop, Gloucestershire, and 30 gold mancuses. (b) Æthelred, ealdorman, to Cynulf, son of Ceoluht; lease, for three lives, of the land at Stoke Bishop, with reversion to the bishopric of Worcester. Latin and English with English bounds.	Latin and English with English bounds, Worcester	Ealdorman (of Mercia)
219	552		A.D. 884 (Hrisbyri, ? Princes Risborough, Bucks)	Æthelred, lord of the Mercians	Æthelwulf	Grant of 5 hides (manentes) at Himbleton, Worcestershire, with appurtenant salt-workings etcirca.	Latin with English bounds, Worcester	Ealdorman (of Mercia)
220	557		A.D. 888 (Droitwich, Worcs)	Æthelred, procurator of Mercia	Wulfgar, minister	Grant of 15 hides (manentes) at Walden, Hertfordshire	Latin, St Albans	Ealdorman (of Mercia)
221	587		A.D. 901 (Shrewsbury)	Æthelred and Æthelflæd, rulers of Mercia	the community of the church of Much Wenlock	Grant of 10 hides (cassatae) at Stanton Long and 3 hides (manentes) at Caughley in Barrow, Shropshire., in exchange for 3 hides (manentes) at Easthope and 5 at Patton, Shropshire. They also grant a gold chalice weighing 30 mancuses in honour of Abbess Mildburg.	Latin, Much Wenlock	Ealdorman (of Mercia)
222	537		A.D. 883 x 911	Æthelred, dux Merciorum	Cuthulf, minister	Renewal of the grant by King Burgred of 10 hides (manentes) at Marlcliff in Cleeve Prior, Worcestershire, the ancient landbook having been carried off by 'pagans' (Vikings); with a note that the beneficiary later granted the land to the church of Worcester.	Latin with English bounds, Worcester	Ealdorman (of Mercia)
223	579		A.D. 884 x 901	Æthelred, ealdorman, and Æthelflæd	the church of St Peter, Worcester	Grant of rights at Worcester.	English, Worcester	Ealdorman (of Mercia)
224	583		A.D. 800 for ? 914	Æthelflæd, lady of the Mercians	Ealhhelm	Grant of 2 hides (manentes) at Stantun (? Stanton by Newhall, Derbyshire), in return for 60 swine and 300 solidi.	Latin, Burton	Æthelflæd (of Mercia)
225	632		A.D. 878 for 915 (Weardburg, 16 Sept)	Æthelflæd, ruler of the Mercians	Eadric, minister	Grant of permission to acquire 10 hides (manentes) at Farnborough (Warwickshire or Berkshire), bought from Wulflaf. The original landbook, granted by King Offa to Bynna, Wulflaf's great-great-grandfather (abavus), had been destroyed in a fire.	Latin, Abingdon	Æthelflæd (of Mercia)
226	511		No date.	Edward, king of Mercia	the church of St Mary, Cronuchamme (Evesham)	Grant of 5 hides (manentes) at Lench, Worcestershire	Latin, Evesham	Edward (of Mercia)
227	25		A.D. 670	Cenwalh, king of Wessex	Beorhtwald, abbot	Grant of 1 hide (cassatus) and two small islands, with a fishery, at Meare, Somerset.	Latin, Glastonbury	Cenwealh (of Wessex)
228	26		A.D. 671	Cenwalh, king	the see of Sherborne	Grant of exemption from secular dues.	Latin, Sherborne	Cenwealh (of Wessex)
229	27		No date.	Cenwalh, king of Wessex	the church of SS Peter and Paul, Winchester (Old Minster)	Grant of 100 hides (mansae) at Downton, Wiltshire	Latin with English bounds, Winchester, Old Minster	Cenwealh (of Wessex)
230	50		A.D. 680 (? for 685)	Cædwalla, king	Wilfrid, bishop	Grant of 70 hides (tributarii) at Pagham, Shripney, Charlton, Bognor, Bersted, North Bersted, Crimsham, North and South Mundham (and, in the shortened version, Slindon), all in Sussex, and to the community at St Andrew's church situated on the east of the harbour called Uedringmutha (Pagham Harbour), grant of 10 hides (tributarii) at Tangmere, Sussex.	Latin with bounds, Canterbury, Christ Church	Cædwalla (of Wessex)
231	63		A.D. 682 ? for 688 (Aug)	Cædwalla, king	the church (of Malmesbury)	Grant of 132 hides (cassati) on either side of the wood named Kemele (? Kemble, Gloucestershire).	Latin, Malmesbury	Cædwalla (of Wessex)
232	64		A.D. 673 for ? 683 (3 Aug)	Cædwalla, king	Wilfrid, bishop, in order to found a monastery at Selsey	Grant of 55 hides (tributarii) at Selsey, Medmerry, Wittering, Itchenor, Birdham, Egesawde, Bessenheie, Brinfast and Sidlesham, with 6 hides (cassati) at Aldingbourne and Lidsey, 6 at Geinstidegate (? Westergate), 8 at (North) Mundham, 8 at [Amberley and] Houghton and 4 at Coldwaltham, all in Sussex.	Latin with bounds, Selsey	Cædwalla (of Wessex)
233	89		circa A.D. 687 and 691 (Medeshamstede, ie	Peterborough, Northants.). (a) Cædwalla, king of the (West) Saxons	Ecgbald, abbot, and his familia	Grant of 40 hides (manentes) at Hoo (ad Hebureahg insulam), Kent. (b) Swæfheard, king of Kent, to Ecgbald, abbot; grant of adjoining 20 hides at Hoo and woodland at Fercanhamstede. (c). Confirmation by Æthelred, king of Mercia.	Latin, Peterborough	Cædwalla (of Wessex)
234	70		A.D. 688 (19 Aug)	Cædwalla, king	Aldhelm, abbot	Grant of 140 hides (manentes) on both sides of the wood called Kemele (Kemble, Gloucestershire), 30 on the east side of the wood of Braydon, Wiltshire, and 5 at the confluence of the rivers Avon and Wylye.	Latin, Malmesbury	Cædwalla (of Wessex)
235	72		A.D. 688 (Besingahearh)	Cædwalla, king of the (West) Saxons	Cedde, Cisi and Criswa (? Crispa)	Grant, for the foundation of a minster, of 60 hides (cassati) at Farnham, Surrey, including 10 at Binton and 2 at Churt, Surrey, and land at Cusanweoh.	Latin, Winchester, Old Minster	Cædwalla (of Wessex)
236	61		A.D. 681	Baldred, king	Hæmgils, abbot, and the church of Our Lady and St Patrick, Glastonbury	Grant of 12 (or 6) hides (manentes) at Pennard, Somerset.	Latin with English bounds, Glastonbury	Bealdred (of Wessex)
237	62		A.D. 682	Centwine, king of the (West) Saxons	Hæmgils, abbot of Glastonbury	Grant of 23 hides (mansiones) near Quantock Wood and 3 hides (cassati) at Crycbeorh (probably Creechbarrow Hill, near Taunton), Somerset.	Latin with bounds, Glastonbury	Centwine (of Wessex)
238	121		A.D. 663 for ? 693 (20 July)	Ine, king of the (West) Saxons	Hæmgils, abbot	Grant of 10 hides (cassati) at Brent, Somerset.	Latin with bounds, Glastonbury	Ine (of Wessex)
239	100		A.D. 687 (5 July)	Ine, King of Wessex	Hean, abbot	Grant of 15 hides (cassati) at Bradfield, 15 at Bestlesforda (near Basildon), 25 at Streatley and 80 at Æaromundeslee, all in Berkshire	Latin, Abingdon	Ine (of Wessex)
240			A.D. 693 = ? 692 (30 Decirca)	Ine, king of the Saxons	Froda, abbot	Grant of 40 hides (cassati) by the river Isle, and a wood called Stretmerch, Somerset.	Latin, Muchelney	Ine (of Wessex)
241	101		A.D. 699	Ine, king of the (West) Saxons	Hean, abbot	Restoration of land at Abingdon, Berkshire, for the construction of a minster, with an account of the early history of Abingdon Abbey, including mention of grants of land by the river Thames, at Bestlesford (near Basildon) and at Bradfield, Berkshire	Latin, Abingdon	Ine (of Wessex)
242	102		A.D. 701	Ine, king	the church of SS Peter and Paul, Winchester	Restitution of 40 hides (mansae) at Alresford, Hampshire, previously granted by King Cenwalh.	Latin with English bounds, Winchester, Old Minster	Ine (of Wessex)
243	103		A.D. 701	Ine, king of the (West) Saxons	Aldhelm, abbot, for the monastery of Malmesbury	Grant of 45 hides (cassati), consisting of 5 hides at Garsdon, 20 and 10 hides by Corsaburn (Gauze Brook, cf. Corston) and 10 hides at Rodbourne in Malmesbury, all in Wiltshire	Latin, Malmesbury	Ine (of Wessex)
244			A.D. 702	Ine, king of the Saxons	Beganus (? Beaga)	Grant of one hide (mansa) Athom (possibly Ham, near Muchelney, Somerset) and a fishery on the river Parret.	Latin with bounds in Latin and English, Muchelney	Ine (of Wessex)
245	108		A.D. 704 (Everley, Wilts, 26 May)	Ine, king	the churches and monasteries (of Wessex)	Grant of exemption from secular burdens.	Latin, Malmesbury (and Glastonbury)	Ine (of Wessex)
246	109		A.D. 704 (Glastonbury)	Ine, king	the church of SS Mary and Patrick, Glastonbury	Grant of freedom from secular burdens.	Latin, Glastonbury	Ine (of Wessex)
247	112		A.D. 705 or 706 (June)	Ine, king of the Saxons	Beorhtwald, abbot of Glastonbury	Grant of 20 hides (cassati) on the river Sheppey (formerly Doulting), Somerset.	Latin with English bounds, Glastonbury	Ine (of Wessex)
248	113		A.D. 705 or 706 (June)	Ine, king (of Wessex)	Beorhtwald, abbot	Grant of 20 hides (casati) by the river Tone, 20 hides (manentes) by the river Sheppey (formerly Doulting) and 20 hides west of Corscombe (? North Wootton), all in Somerset.	Latin, Glastonbury	Ine (of Wessex)
249			A.D. 725	Ine, king of Wessex	Froda, abbot, and the community at Muchelney	Grant of 20 hides (manentes) at Ilminster, Somerset.	Latin with English bounds, Muchelney	Ine (of Wessex)
250	142		A.D. 725	Ine, king (of Wessex)	the church at Glastonbury	Grant of 10 hides at Brent, 10 at Sowy (cf. Middlezoy, Westonzoyland), 20 at Pilton, 20 at Doulting and 1 at Bleadney, Somerset, and confirmation of land at Meare, Beckery, Godney, Marchey, Andersey (Nyland), Lantocai (? Leigh in Street), Pennard and Pouelt (cf. Polden Hills), Somerset, with general grant of privileges and reference to dependent churches at Sowy, Middlezoy, Brent, Moorlinch, Shapwick, Street, Butleigh and Pilton.	Latin, Glastonbury	Ine (of Wessex)
251	143		A.D. 725	Ine, king of Wessex	the familia at Glastonbury	Grant of 12 hides (manentes) at Sowy (cf. Othery, Middlezoy and Westonzoyland), Somerset.	Latin with English bounds, Glastonbury	Ine (of Wessex)
252	74		A.D. 688 x 690	Ine, king of Wessex	Hean, patricius, and to Ceolswith	Grant of 45 hides (cassati) at Bradfield, Bestlesford (near Basildon) and Streatley, all in Berkshire, for the construction of a monastery.	Latin, Abingdon	Ine (of Wessex)
253	147		A.D. 729 (Pencrik)		Coengisl, abbot, and the familia in Glastonbury minster	Grant of 60 hides (manentes) at Pouholt (cf. Polden Hills, Somerset).	Latin with bounds, Glastonbury	Æthelheard (of Wessex)
254	158		A.D. 737	Æthelheard, king	the church of SS Peter and Paul, Winchester	Grant of 4 hides (mansae) at Withiel Florey, Somerset, and 3 at Cearn (probably Charmouth, Dorset), in augmentation of Queen Frithugyth's gift of land at Taunton.	Latin with English bounds, Winchester, Old Minster	Æthelheard (of Wessex)
255	1331		A.D. 739 (10 April)	Æthelheard, king	Forthhere, bishop	Grant of 20 hides (cassati) at Crediton, Devon.	Latin with English bounds, Exeter (ex Crediton)	Æthelheard (of Wessex)
256	170		A.D. 745 (Malmesbury)	Cuthred, king of the Gewisse	Aldhelm, abbot, and Malmesbury Abbey	Grant of 10 hides (mansiones) at Wootton Bassett, Wiltshire	Latin, Malmesbury	Cuthred (of Wessex)
257	169		A.D. 745 (Glastonbury, ? 30 April)	Cuthred, king of Wessex	Glastonbury Abbey	Confirmation of grants made by previous kings to Glastonbury.	Latin, Glastonbury	Cuthred (of Wessex)
258	179		A.D. 749	Cuthred, king	the church of SS Peter and Paul, Winchester	Grant of 10 hides (familiae) at Clere (Highclere, Hampshire).	Latin with English bounds, Winchester, Old Minster	Cuthred (of Wessex)
259	180		A.D. 749	Cuthred, king	the church of SS Peter and Paul, Winchester	Grant of 7 hides (familiae), consisting of 5 hides (mansae) at Thruhham (now Park Farm, Beaulieu), 1 at Eppelhyrste (lost, near Brockenhurst) and 1 at Hwitanleage (Whitley, near Brockenhurst), Hampshire	Latin, Winchester, Old Minster	Cuthred (of Wessex)
260	185		A.D. 758	Cynewulf, king	Malmesbury Abbey	Grant of 30 hides (manentes) at Moredon and Rodbourne, Wiltshire	Latin, Malmesbury	Cynewulf (of Wessex)
261			A.D. 762 (Pentric, ? Pentridge, Dorset)	Cynewulf, king of Wessex	Eadwald, abbot, and Muchelney Abbey	Grant of 8 hides (cassati) between the rivers Earn (now the Fivehead) and Isle, probably at Isle Abbotts, Somerset.	Latin with bounds, Muchelney	Cynewulf (of Wessex)
262	200		A.D. 766 for ? 774	Cynewulf, king of Wessex	St Andrew's minster, Wells	Grant of 2 (or 11) hides (manentes) on the river Wellow, Somerset.	Latin with bounds, Wells	Cynewulf (of Wessex)
263	224		A.D. 774	Cynewulf, king	the church of Sherborne	Grant of one hide (mansio) at Lyme, Dorset, to be used for saltmaking.	Latin, Sherborne	Cynewulf (of Wessex)
264	225		A.D. 778	Cynewulf, king of the Saxons	Bica, comes and minister	Grant of 13 hides (manentes) at Little Bedwyn, Wiltshire	Latin with bounds, uncertain (possibly Bedwyn)	Cynewulf (of Wessex)
265	327		A.D. 808 for 757 x 758	Cynewulf, king of the Saxons	the brethren of St Peter's Minster, Bath	Grant of 5 hides (mansiones) at North Stoke, Somerset.	Latin with English bounds, Bath	Cynewulf (of Wessex)
266	242		A.D. 761' altered to '781'	Æthelberht, king of Wessex and Kent	Deora, bishop of Rochester	Grant of land at Rochester, Kent.	Latin with English bounds, Rochester	Æthelberht (of Wessex)
267			A.D. 794 (Wyndingesley)	Beorhtric, king of Wessex	Wigferth, præfectus	Grant of 10 hides (cassati) on the river Parret, Somerset.	Latin with bounds, Athelney	Beorhtric (of Wessex)
268	282		A.D. 801	Beorhtric, king	Lulla, his princeps	Grant of 10 hides (mansiones) at Crux Easton, Hampshire	Latin with bounds, Abingdon	Beorhtric (of Wessex)
269	258		A.D. 786 x 794	Beorhtric, king	Hemele, his princeps	Grant of 36 hides (cassati) by the Hissaburna (the Bourne Rivulet), Hampshire, in exchange for 34 hides by the river Meon, grantd to Hemele by King Cynewulf.	Latin, Abingdon	Beorhtric (of Wessex)
270	411		A.D. 773 for 833	Egbert, king of Kent	Dunn, abbot, and the church of St Mary's (Lyminge)	Grant of 150 iugera at Sandtun (Sampton, lost, in West Hythe, Kent).	Latin with bounds, Canterbury, Christ Church (ex Lyminge)	Ecgberht (of Wessex)
270a	300		A.D. 801	Edbirtus (? Egbert), king of Wessex	Eadgils, his minister	Grant of 20 hides (mansiones) at Butleigh, Somerset.	Latin with English bounds, Glastonbury	Ecgberht (of Wessex)
271	395		A.D. 823	Egbert, king of England	St Andrew's church, Rochester	Grant of privileges.	Latin, Rochester	Ecgberht (of Wessex)
272	390		A.D. 825 (Criodantreow, 19 Aug; Southampton, 26 Decirca)	Egbert, king	Old Minster, Winchester	Grant of 15 hides (manentes) at Alton Priors, Wiltshire, formerly held by Burgheard, præfectus.	Latin with English bounds, Winchester, Old Minster	Ecgberht (of Wessex)
273	389		A.D. 825 (Creodantreow, 19 Aug; Southampton, 26 Decirca)	Egbert, king	the minster of SS Peter and Paul (Winchester)	Grant of 5 hides (cassati) at (Martyr) Worthy, Hampshire	Latin with English bounds, Winchester, Old Minster	Ecgberht (of Wessex)
274	392		A.D. 826	Egbert, king	the bishopric of Winchester	Grant of 30 hides (mansae) at Calbourne, Isle of Wight.	Latin with English bounds, Winchester, Old Minster	Ecgberht (of Wessex)
275	391		A.D. 826 (Southampton)	Egbert, king of Wessex	the church of SS Peter and Paul, Winchester	Grant of 55 hides (mansae) at Downton and 45 at Ebbesborne, Wiltshire	Latin with English bounds, Winchester, Old Minster	Ecgberht (of Wessex)
276	393		A.D. 826 (Southampton)	Egbert, king	the minster of SS Peter and Paul, Winchester	Grant of 20 hides (manentes) at Droxford, Hampshire	Latin with English bounds, Winchester, Old Minster	Ecgberht (of Wessex)
277	410		A.D. 833 (Dorchester, Dorset, 26 Decirca)	Egbert, king of Wessex	Beornwyn, Ælfflæd and Walenburch, sisters	Confirmation of 10 hides (manentes) at Woolland, Dorset, the old charters having been lost, and of the new division between the sisters following Beornwyn's inheritance of land at Dartington, Devon.	Latin with English bounds, Shaftesbury	Ecgberht (of Wessex)
278	413		A.D. 835 (Dorchester-on-Thames, Oxon)	Egbert, king of Wessex	Abingdon Abbey	Grant of 50 hides (manentes) at Marcham, Berkshire	Latin, Abingdon	Ecgberht (of Wessex)
279	852		A.D. 836	Egbert, king of the West Saxons	Ciaba, a clericus living in St Peter's minster (St Augustine's), Canterbury	Grant, for life, of one sulung (aratrum) on Scirdun, formerly belonging to the royal vill at Canterbury, in return for 100 mancuses, with reversion to St Augustine's.	Latin with bounds, Canterbury, St Augustine's	Ecgberht (of Wessex)
280	418		A.D. 838 (Fræricburna, [Surrey])	Egbert, king	Beornmod, bishop	Grant of 4 sulungs (aratra) at Snodland and Holborough, Kent, with pastures and a viculus in the eastern part of Rochester, Kent.	Latin, Rochester	Ecgberht (of Wessex)
281	423		A.D. 838 (Kingston-on-Thames, Surrey)	Egbert, king of Wessex	the see of Winchester	Grant of 40 hides (cassati) at Shalfleet, Isle of Wight, conditional upon the loyalty of Bishop Ealdhun and his successors to Æthelwulf; with later confirmation (A.D. 839, Vetustissimus = æt Astran) by a Southumbrian synod.	Latin, Winchester, Old Minster	Ecgberht (of Wessex)
282	396		A.D. 845 for 830	Egbert, king of Wessex and Kent	Ætheric, minister	Grant of 5 sulungs (aratra) at Warehorne and Flotham (lost), Kent, in return for 50 mancuses.	Latin with English bounds, Canterbury, Christ Church	Ecgberht (of Wessex)
283	377		A.D. 924 for ? 824 (Acleah)	Egbert, king of Wessex	Wulfheard, præfectus	Grant of 22 hides (manentes) on the river Meon, Hampshire	Latin with English bounds, Winchester, Old Minster	Ecgberht (of Wessex)
284	398		[A.D. 824 x 833]	Egbert, king	the church of Winchester	Restitution of 40 hides (mansae) at Alresford, Hampshire	Latin with English bounds, Winchester, Old Minster	Ecgberht (of Wessex)
285	394		A.D. 827	Æthelwulf, king	Chertsey Abbey	Confirmation of land and privileges.	Latin, Chertsey	Æthelwulf (of Wessex)
286	419		A.D. 838 (Canterbury, 19 Nov)	Æthelwulf, king of Kent	Ceolnoth, archbishop	Grant of one hide (mansio) at Eastre(a)stadelham.	Latin with English bounds, Canterbury, Christ Church	Æthelwulf (of Wessex)
286a			A.D. 838 for ?839 (Faversham, Kent, 9 March)	Æthelwulf, king of Wessex and of Kent	Wernoth, abbot, and the familia of St Augustine's	Grant of 5 sulungs (aratra) at Lenham, Kent.	Latin with bounds, Canterbury, St Augustine's	Æthelwulf (of Wessex)
287	426		(1) A.D. 839 (Wye, Kent)	Æthelwulf, king of Wessex	Ithda or Dudda	Grant of land at Canterbury. (2) Confirmation by Alfred, king of Wessex and note of purchase by Lulla from Æthelwald (A.D. 871 x 888). (3) Later note of purchase by Archbishop Dunstan and grant to St Martin's, Canterbury (A.D. 959 x 988).	Latin with English, Canterbury, Christ Church	Æthelwulf (of Wessex)
288	431		A.D. 840 (Southampton)	Æthelwulf, king of Wessex	Duda, his minister	Grant of 10 hides (cassati) at Asshedoune (cf. Ashdown Park in Ashbury, Berkshire).	Latin, Glastonbury	Æthelwulf (of Wessex)
289	437		A.D. 841	Æthelwulf, king of Wessex	Beornmod, bishop of Rochester	Grant of 2 sulungs (aratra) at Holborough, Kent.	Latin, Rochester	Æthelwulf (of Wessex)
290			A.D. 841 [for 840] (Æscantun, 26 December)	Æthelwulf, king of Wessex	Eadberht, deacon	Grant of 15 hides (cassati) at Halstock, Devon, with a later confirmation at a meeting at Edington, Wiltshire (circa A.D. 852 x 855 [? Easter 854]).	Latin with English bounds, Sherborne	Æthelwulf (of Wessex)
291	439		A.D. 842	Æthelwulf, king of the South Peoples	Ceolmund, his præfectus	Grant of 1 sulung (aratrum) and a viculus near Rochester, Kent.	Latin, Rochester	Æthelwulf (of Wessex)
292	438		A.D. 842 (Andredesdune)	Æthelwulf, king of Wessex	Eanwulf, his princeps	Grant of 25 hides (cassati) at Ditcheat and 5 at Lottisham, Somerset.	Latin with English bounds, Glastonbury	Æthelwulf (of Wessex)
293	442		A.D. 843 (Mereworth, Kent, 28 May)	Æthelwulf, king of Wessex and Kent	Æthelmod, his minister	Grant of 10 sulungs (aratra) at (Little) Chart, Kent, with woodland and swine pastures.	Latin with bounds, Canterbury, Christ Church	Æthelwulf (of Wessex)
294			A.D. 844 (Winchester, 5 Nov)	Æthelwulf, king of Wessex	the church at Sherborne	Grant of privileges ('First Decimation').	Latin, Sherborne	Æthelwulf (of Wessex)
294a			A.D. 814 or 855 for 844 (Winchester, 5 Nov)	Æthelwulf, king of Wessex	the Church	General grant of lands and privileges ('First Decimation').	Latin, Malmesbury and Crowland	Æthelwulf (of Wessex)
294b			A.D. 844 (Winchester, 5 Nov)	Æthelwulf, king of Wessex	the Church	Grant of privileges, with particular mention of lands belonging to the church of Malmesbury at Ellendune (Wroughton), Wiltshire (30 hides); Elmhamstede (15 hides); and at Wootton (10 hides), Charlton near Malmesbury (20 hides), Minety (5 hides), and Rodbourne, Wiltshire (10 hides). ('First Decimation'.)	) Latin, Malmesbury	Æthelwulf (of Wessex)
295			A.D. 844	Æthelwulf, king of Wessex	the church at Sherborne	Grant of 2 hides (cassati) at Osansto.	Latin, Sherborne	Æthelwulf (of Wessex)
296	449		A.D. 845 (Wye, Kent, 16 Nov)	Æthelwulf, king of Wessex and Kent	Badanoth, his apparitor	Grant of land near Canterbury, in return for 15 mancuses of gold.	Latin, Canterbury, Christ Church	Æthelwulf (of Wessex)
297	853		A.D. 845 (Wye, Kent, 16 Nov)	Æthelwulf, king of Wessex and Kent	Wynhere, abbot of St Augustine's	Grant of 1 sulung (aratrum) at Lillicesora (? Lynsore, near Bossingham, Kent), in return for 70 mancuses.	Latin with bounds, Canterbury, St Augustine's	Æthelwulf (of Wessex)
298	451		A.D. 847 [= 846] (Dorchester, Dorset, 26 Decirca)	Æthelwulf, king of Wessex	himself	Grant of 20 hides (cassati) om Homme (at South Hams, Devon).	Latin with English bounds, Winchester, Old Minster	Æthelwulf (of Wessex)
299	460		A.D. 850	Æthelwulf, king of Wessex, and Athelstan, king of Kent	Ealhhere, princeps	Grant of land near Rochester, with a church dedicated to St Mary.	Latin, Rochester	Æthelwulf (of Wessex)
300	459		A.D. 850 (Wilton, Wilts)	Æthelwulf, king of Wessex	Ealhhere, his princeps	Grant of 40 hides (cassati) at Lenham, Kent, with rights in Blean wood.	Latin with English bounds, Canterbury, St Augustine's	Æthelwulf (of Wessex)
301	457		A.D. 850	Æthelwulf, king of Wessex	the church of St Peter, Malmesbury	Grant of 10 hides (mansiones) at Dauntsey, Wiltshire	Latin, Malmesbury	Æthelwulf (of Wessex)
302	471		A.D. 854 (Wilton, Wilts, 22 April)	Æthelwulf, king of Wessex	the Church	General grant of land and privileges ('Second Decimation').	Latin, Abingdon	Æthelwulf (of Wessex)
303	472		A.D. 854 (Wilton, Wilts, 22 April)	Æthelwulf, king of Wessex	the Church	General grant of lands and privileges with a list of the Glastonbury estates affected, namely 5 hides at Buckland Newton, Dorset; 6 at Pennard, Somerset; 1 at Cetenes felda; 6 at Cerawycombe (? Crowcombe, Somerset); 10 hides at Sowy (cf. Middlezoy, Westonzoyland), 3 at Puriton, 1.5 at Montacute (Lodegaresbergh), Somerset; 1.5 at Culmstock, 0.5 at Monk Okehampton and 0.5 at Braunton, Devon ('Second Decimation').	Latin with English bounds, Glastonbury	Æthelwulf (of Wessex)
304	468		A.D. 854 (Wilton, Wilts, 22 April)	Æthelwulf, king of Wessex	the Church	General grant of privileges, with specific grant to Hunsige, minister, for 3 hides (cassati) at Martyr Worthy, Hampshire ('Second Decimation').	Latin with English bounds, Winchester, Old Minster	Æthelwulf (of Wessex)
305	470		A.D. 854 (Wilton, 22 April)	Æthelwulf, king of Wessex	the Church	General grant of land and privileges, with list of lands assigned to Malmesbury Abbey, namely at 35 hides at Purton, 15 at Lacock, 5 at Sutton Benger, 5 at Corston, 10 at Crudwell, Wiltshire; 10 at Kemble, Gloucestershire; and 1.5 at Dauntsey, Wiltshire ('Second Decimation').	Latin with English bounds, Malmesbury	Æthelwulf (of Wessex)
306	481		A.D. 854	Æthelwulf, king of Wessex	St Peter and the familia of Malmesbury	Grant of 5 hides (mansiones) at Tockenham, Wiltshire	Latin, Malmesbury	Æthelwulf (of Wessex)
307	474		A.D. 854 (Wilton, Wilts, 22 April)	Æthelwulf, king of Wessex	the Church	General grant of land and privileges with specific grant to Swithhun, bishop, for the church of SS Peter and Paul, Winchester, of 30 hides (cassati) at Brightwell, Berkshire ('Second Decimation').	Latin, Winchester, Old Minster	Æthelwulf (of Wessex)
308	469		A.D. 854 (Wilton, Wilts, 22 April)	Æthelwulf, king of Wessex	the Church	General grant of land and privileges with specific grant to Wiferth, minister, of 1 hide (cassatum) at Hardenhuish, Wiltshire ('Second Decimation').	Latin with English bounds, uncertain	Æthelwulf (of Wessex)
309	473		A.D. 854 (Wilton, 22 April)	Æthelwulf, king	the church of SS Peter and Paul, Winchester	Restitution of 3 hides (mansae) at Headbourne Worthy, Hampshire, originally granted by King Cenwalh.	Latin with English bounds, Winchester, Old Minster	Æthelwulf (of Wessex)
310	475		A.D. 854 (Wilton, 2Wilts, 2 April)	Æthelwulf, king of Wessex	the church of SS Peter and Paul, Winchester	Grant of 8 hides (manentes) at Ruishton, and 8 at Stoke St Mary in (æt) Orchard Portman, Somerset, to augment the estate at Taunton given by Queen Frithugyth.	Latin with English bounds, Winchester, Old Minster	Æthelwulf (of Wessex)
311	476		A.D. 854 (Wilton, Wilts, 22 April)	Æthelwulf, king of Wessex	the church of SS Peter and Paul, Winchester	Grant of 133 hides (manentes) at Taunton and 10 at Brown, Somerset.	Latin with bounds, Winchester, Old Minster	Æthelwulf (of Wessex)
312	477		A.D. 854	Æthelwulf, king of Wessex	the church of SS Peter and Paul, Winchester	Grant of 20 hides (mansae) at Wanborough (i.e Little Hinton), Wiltshire	Latin with English bounds, Winchester, Old Minster	Æthelwulf (of Wessex)
313	478		A.D. 854	Æthelwulf, king of Wessex	St Peter and the Old Minster, Winchester	Grant of 20 hides at Wanborough, Wiltshire	English, Winchester, Old Minster	Æthelwulf (of Wessex)
315	486(1)		A.D. 855	Æthelwulf, king of Wessex and Kent	Dunn, his minister	Grant of a messuage (haga) in the south of the city of Rochester, Kent.	Latin, Rochester	Æthelwulf (of Wessex)
316	467		A.D. 855 for ? 853	Æthelwulf, king of Wessex and Kent	Ealdhere, his minister	Grant of 1 sulung (aratrum) at Ulaham, Kent.	Latin with bounds, Canterbury, Christ Church	Æthelwulf (of Wessex)
317	491		A.D. 856	Æthelwulf, king of Wessex	Ealdred, his minister	Grant of 20 hides (cassati) at Æscesbyrig (i.e. Woolstone), Berkshire	Latin with English bounds, Winchester, Old Minster	Æthelwulf (of Wessex)
318	494		A.D. 857 (London, Nov)	Æthelwulf, king of the English	the Abbey of Saint-Denis (Paris)	Confirmation of lands at Rotherfield, Hastings, Pevensey, Sussex; and at Lundenuuic (London).	Latin, Paris, Saint-Denis	Æthelwulf (of Wessex)
319	538		A.D. 874' ? for 844	Æthelwulf, king of Wessex and Kent	Eadred	Grant of land at Horton, near Canterbury, Kent.	Latin with bounds, Canterbury, Christ Church	Æthelwulf (of Wessex)
320	444		A.D. 880 ? for 855	Æthelwulf, king of Wessex, Kent, and of all the southern people of the English	Malmesbury Abbey	Grant of 5 hides (mansiunculae) at Minety, Wiltshire	Latin, Malmesbury	Æthelwulf (of Wessex)
321	548		A.D. 880	Æthelwulf, king of the Saxons	the church of St Andrew (Rochester) and bishop Swithulf	Grant of 3 sulungs (aratra) at Cuxton, with meadow at Chatham, Kent.	Latin with English bounds, Rochester	Æthelwulf (of Wessex)
323	407		circa A.D. 833 x 839, perhaps 833 x 836	Æthelwulf, king of Kent	(Christ Church, Canterbury)	Confirmation of lands at Langham, Blakeburneham, Plegwingham, Ofneham; pasture in Hliossole and Ægelbertinherst; common in woods in Estcogheringdenne and Hyringdenne; land at Canterbury with meadows at Shettinge and Thanington, Kent.	Latin with bounds, Canterbury, Christ Church	Æthelwulf (of Wessex)
324	854		[A.D. 850]	Æthelwulf, king of Wessex	Wernoth, abbot of SS Peter and Paul (St Augustine's, Canterbury)	Grant of 40 hides (cassati) at Lenham, Kent.	Latin, Canterbury, St Augustine's	Æthelwulf (of Wessex)
325	493		[A.D. 854]	Æthelwulf, king	(Winchester Cathedral)	Confirmation of the beneficial hidation of Chilcomb, Hampshire	English, Winchester, Old Minster	Æthelwulf (of Wessex)
326	500		A.D. 860	Æthelbald, king of Wessex	Osmund, his minister	Grant of 14 hides (cassati) at Teffont, Wiltshire	Latin with English bounds, Shaftesbury	Æthelbald (of Wessex)
327	502		A.D. ? 860 (altered to 790)	Æthelberht, king of Wessex and Kent	Wærmund, bishop	Grant of land at Rochester with a marsh, in return for 15 pounds and 30 mancuses.	Latin with English bounds, Rochester	Æthelberht (of Wessex)
328	496		A.D. 858	Æthelberht, king	Wulflaf, his minister	Grant of 5 sulungs (aratra) at Wassingwell in exchange for 5 sulungs at Mersham, Kent, with conversion of the latter into folkland.	Latin with English, bounds in Latin, Canterbury, Christ Church	Æthelberht (of Wessex)
329	499		A.D. 860 (Somerton, Somerset)	Æthelberht, king of Wessex	Osmund, his minister	Grant of 3 sulungs (cassati) at Dinton, Wiltshire	Latin with English bounds, Shaftesbury	Æthelberht (of Wessex)
330	855		A.D. 861 (Fregetburna (? = Freoricburna), Surrey)	Æthelberht, king of Wessex and Kent	Diernoth, abbot, and his familia	Grant of 3 sulungs (aratra) at Martin, Kent.	Latin with bounds, Canterbury, St Augustine's	Æthelberht (of Wessex)
331	506		A.D. 862 (Willherestrio)	Æthelberht, king of Wessex and Kent	Dryhtwald, minister	Grant of 10 sulungs (aratra) at Bromley, Kent.	Latin with English bounds, Rochester	Æthelberht (of Wessex)
332	507		A.D. 863 (Birenefeld)	(1) Æthelberht, king of Wessex and Kent	Æthelred, minister	Grant of 9 sulungs (aratra) at Mersham, Kent, in return for 400 mancuses of gold. Latin with bounds. (2) Eadwald to St Augustine's, Canterbury; grant of land at Willesborough, Kent.	Latin with bounds, Canterbury, Christ Church	Æthelberht (of Wessex)
333	510		A.D. 864 (Dorchester, Dorset, 26 Decirca)	Æthelberht, king of Wessex	the church of Sherborne	Grant of privileges, with note that Æthelberht placed the charter on the high altar at Sherborne (A.D. 865, Good Friday).	English, Sherborne	Æthelberht (of Wessex)
334	525		A.D. 859 ? for 869 or 870 (Woodyates, Dorset)	Æthelred, king of the Saxons	Ælfstan, princeps	Grant of 2 hides (cassati) at Cheselbourne, Dorset.	Latin with English bounds, Shaftesbury	Æthelred (of Wessex)
335	504		A.D. 862 (Micheldever, Hants)	Æthelred, king of Wessex	Æthelwulf, princeps	Grant of 10 hides (cassati) at (Little) Wittenham, Berkshire	Latin with English bounds, Abingdon	Æthelred (of Wessex)
336	508		A.D. 863 (Dorchester, Dorset)	Æthelred, king of Wessex	Wulfhere, princeps	Grant of 6 hides (cassati) at Buttermere, Wiltshire, and at Æscmere.	Latin with English bounds, Winchester, Old Minster	Æthelred (of Wessex)
337	1210		A.D. 867	Edgar (? for Æthelred), king	St Paul's Monastery	Grant of 15 hides (mansiones) at Navestock, Essex.	Latin, London, St Paul's	Æthelred (of Wessex)
338	516		A.D. 867 (Canterbury)	Æthelred, king of Wessex and Kent	Wighelm, presbyter	Grant of a seat in the church of St Martin, with land appurtenant.	Latin with bounds, Canterbury, Christ Church	Æthelred (of Wessex)
338a			A.D. 948 for 868 (Sutton Courtenay, Berks)	Æthelred, king of Wessex	Cuthred, his minister	Grant of 5 hides (cassati) at Balking, Berkshire	Latin, Abingdon	Æthelred (of Wessex)
339	518		A.D. 868	Æthelred, king of Wessex and Kent	Cuthwulf, bishop of Rochester	Grant of land near Rochester, Kent.	Latin with English bounds, Rochester	Æthelred (of Wessex)
340	520		A.D. 868 (Dorchester, Dorset)	Æthelred, king of Wessex	Hunsige, his minister	Grant of 5 hides (cassati) at Martyr Worthy, Hampshire	Latin with English bounds, Winchester, Old Minster	Æthelred (of Wessex)
341	886		A.D. 869	Æthelred, king of Wessex	Wulfhere, his princeps	Grant of 25 hides (cassati) at Winterbourne (Monkton), Wiltshire	Latin with English bounds, Glastonbury	Æthelred (of Wessex)
342	526		? A.D. 869 or 870 (Woodyates, Dorset)	Æthelred, king of Wessex	Ælfstan, ealdorman	Grant of 5 hides at Cheselbourne, Dorset.	English with bounds, Shaftesbury	Æthelred (of Wessex)
342a			A.D. 835' for 871 x 899		St Peter's church, Athelney, Somerset	Grant of land at Reodbeorh, with adjacent fishery at Reodwer.	Latin, Athelney	Alfred
343	545		A.D. 852 for ? 878	Alfred, king of Wessex	Athelney Abbey	Grant of 10 hides (cassatae) at Long Sutton, Somerset.	Latin with English bounds, Athelney	Alfred
343a			A.D. 872'	Alfred, king of the English	Athelney Abbey	Grant of privileges in Stathmoor, Saltmoor, Haymoor and Currymoor, with other moors in North Curry, with grant to Abbot John of privileges and revenues in East Lyng, Somerset.	Latin, Athelney	Alfred
344	536		A.D. 873	Alfred, king, and Æthelred, archbishop	Liaba, son of Birgwine	Grant of land at Ileden, Kent, in return for 25 mancuses of gold.	Latin with English, Canterbury, Christ Church	Alfred
345	550		A.D. 882 (Epsom, Surrey)	Alfred, king of the Saxons	Athelstan, his minister	Grant of 15 hides (cassati) at Cyricestun (? Somerset), in return for 30 mancuses and 2 hides at Stoce (? Stoke St Mary, Somerset).	Latin with English bounds, Winchester, Old Minster	Alfred
346	561		A.D. 889	Alfred, king of the English and the Saxons, and Æthelred, subregulus et patricius Merciorum	Wærferth, bishop of Worcester	Grant of land æt Hwætmundes stane in London, with commercial privileges.	Latin, Worcester	Alfred
347	564		A.D. 891 (2 Aug)	Alfred, king of the Anglo-Saxons	Berhtwulf, his faithful comes	Grant of 12 hides (manentes) at Plush in Buckland Newton, Dorset, and 2 (? for 5) at Raddington, Somerset, in exchange for land at Sutton Poyntz, Dorset.	Latin with English bounds, Glastonbury	Alfred
348	567		A.D. 892	Alfred, king of the Anglo-Saxons	Æthelhelm, comes	Grant of 10 hides (manentes) at North Newnton, Wiltshire	Latin with English bounds, Wilton	Alfred
349	571		A.D. 895	Alfred, king of the Saxons	Burhric, bishop of Rochester	Grant of land at Freckenham, Suffolk, and at Isleham, Cambridgeshire	Latin with English bounds, Rochester	Alfred
350	576		A.D. 898 (Woolmer, Hants)	Alfred, king of the Saxons	Sighelm, dux	Grant of 1 hide (manens) at Farleigh, Kent, with appurtenant meadow.	Latin with English and English bounds, Canterbury, Christ Church	Alfred
351	740		A.D. 939	Alfred, king of the English	Heahferth, minister	Grant of 8 hides (mansae) at Worthy, Hampshire	Latin with English bounds, Winchester, Old Minster	Alfred
352	549		A.D. 979 probably for 878 (19 Oct)	Alfred, king	Denewulf, bishop	Grant of 8 hides (manentes) at Ruishton, Somerset.	Latin with English bounds, Winchester, Old Minster	Alfred
353	563		A.D. 871 x 899	Alfred, king of the English	Chertsey Abbey	Grant of 5 hides (mansae) at Thorpe, with Getinges (cf. Eaton Farm, Chobham), Hunewaldesham (cf. Hundulsham, lost, in Weybridge) and Woodham, Surrey.	Latin with English bounds, Chertsey	Alfred
354	565		A.D. 878 x 899	Alfred, king of the Anglo-Saxons	Denewulf, bishop of Winchester, and the church of SS Peter and Paul, Winchester	Regrant of the reversion of 50 hides (manentes) at Chisledon, Wiltshire, and 60 at Hurstbourne Priors, Hampshire, in exchange for 100 hides at Cholsey, Hagbourne and Bæstlæsford (Basildon), Berkshire With bounds of Cholsey, Hagbourne and Bæstlæsford.	Latin with English bounds, Winchester, Old Minster	Alfred
355	581		A.D. 892 x 899	Alfred, king of the Anglo-Saxons	Deormod	Grant of 5 hides (mansi) at Appleford, Berkshire, in exchange for land at Harandun (Horn Down near East Hendred, Berkshire) and 50 mancuses of gold.	Latin with English and English bounds, Abingdon	Alfred
356	568		A.D. 871 x 899 (Malmesbury)	Alfred, king of the Anglo-Saxons, with the consent of the familia of the church of Malmesbury	Dudig, his minister	Lease, for four lives, of 4 hides (cassati) at Chelworth, near Crudwell, Wiltshire, with reversion to the church of Malmesbury.	Latin, Malmesbury	Alfred
357	531		A.D. 871x877	Alfred, king	the church of Shaftesbury	Grant of privileges and of land at Donhead (St Andrew and St Mary), Wiltshire; Compton Abbas, Sixpenny Handley, Gussage (St Andrew), Tarrant Hinton, Iwerne Minster and Fontmell Magna, Dorset.	English and Latin versions, Shaftesbury	Alfred
358	592		A.D. 900 (Winchester)		the familia of Winchester Cathedral	Confirmation of 50 hides (manentes) at Hurstbourne Priors, Hampshire, bequeathed by Alfred and previously acquired by King Egbert from Abingdon Abbey in exchange for 50 hides at Marcham, Berkshire	Latin, Winchester, Old Minster	Edward the Elder
359	594		A.D. 900 (Winchester)		the familia of Winchester Cathedral	Grant of 10 hides (manentes) at Stoke by Hurstbourne, Hampshire, in exchange for land at Chisledon, and Sparcells in Lydiard Millicent, Wiltshire Incorporating a record, in English, of services and dues rendered at Hurstbourne.	Latin with English and English bounds, Winchester, Old Minster	Edward the Elder
360	596		A.D. 900 (Southampton)		New Minster, Winchester	Grant of 100 hides (cassati) at Micheldever, Hampshire With bounds of Micheldever, Cranbourne, Curdridge, Durley, Rigeleah (Slackstead), and Candover, Hampshire, and note, in English, that 7 hides at Worthy belong to Micheldever.	Latin with English and English bounds, Winchester, New Minster	Edward the Elder
361	607		A.D. 900 ? for 904			King Edward confirms the sale by Hungyth to Wigferth of 5 hides (manentes) at Water Eaton, Oxfordshire, the earlier landbook having been lost.	Latin with English bounds, Worcester	Edward the Elder
362	595		A.D. 901		Æthelwulf	Grant of 10 hides (cassati) by the river Wylye (i.e. at Stockton, Wiltshire), forfeited by Wulfhere and his wife for treason; with a note, in English, of the agreement of Æthelwulf and Deormod, granting this land to Deorswith.	Latin with English bounds, Winchester, Old Minster	Edward the Elder
363	589		A.D. 901		the familia of the church of Malmesbury	Grant of 10 hides (cassati) at Hankerton, Wiltshire, in exchange for 10 hides at Farmborough, Somerset.	Latin, Malmesbury	Edward the Elder
364	588		A.D. 901 (Axminster, Devon)		Wihtbrord, his faithful minister	Grant of 10 hides (cassati) at Fovant, Wiltshire	Latin with English bounds, Wilton	Edward the Elder
365	597		A.D. 901			Grant of 15 hides (mansae) at Abbotts Ann, Hampshire	Latin with bounds in Old English, Middle English and Latin, Winchester, New Minster	Edward the Elder
366	598		A.D. 901 (Southampton)			Grant of 50 hides (manentes) at Chisledon, Wiltshire	Latin with bounds in Old English, Middle English and Latin, Winchester, New Minster	Edward the Elder
367	603		A.D. 903			King Edward, with Æthelred and Æthelflæd of Mercia at the request of Æthelfrith, dux, renews the charter of a grant by Athulf to Æthelgyth, his daughter, of 30 hides (cassati) at Monks Risborough, Buckinghamshire	Latin with English bounds, Canterbury, Christ Church	Edward the Elder
367a			A.D. 903			King Edward, with Æthelred and Æthelflæd of Mercia, at the request of Æthelfrith, dux, renews the charter of a grant by Coenwulf, king of Mercia, to Beornnoth, comes, of 10 hides (cassati) at Islington, Middlesex	Latin, London, St Paul's	Edward the Elder
368	600		A.D. 903 (Milton, ? Kent or ? Dorset)		Ordlaf, princeps	Renewal of a charter of Æthelwulf, king of Wessex, granting 20 hides (cassati) at Stanton St Bernard, Wiltshire, to Cenwold, minister.	Latin with English bounds, Wilton	Edward the Elder
369	601		A.D. 903 (Southampton)		Tata, his fasallus	Renewal of a charter of King Æthelwulf, king of Wessex, covering 3 hides (manentes) at Hardwell in Compton Beauchamp, Berkshire, the earlier landbook having been damaged by immersion.	Latin with English bounds, Abingdon	Edward the Elder
370	602		A.D. 903 (Southampton)			King Edward founds New Minster, Winchester, and grants 100 hides (cassati) at Micheldever, 9 at Stratton, 3.5 at Burcot, 8.5 at Popham, 10 at Woodmancott, 10 at Candover, 10 at Cranbourne, 4 at Drayton in Barton Stacey, 3 at Swarraton, 6 at Northington, 3 at Norton near Selborne, 1.5 at Slackstead and Tachbury in Copythorne, and 15 at Abbotts Ann, Hants; 50 at Collingbourne, 40 at Chisledon, Wiltshire; and land at Durley, Hampshire	Latin, Winchester, New Minster	Edward the Elder
371	606		A.D. 904 for 903			King Edward, with Æthelred and Æthelflæd, renews a landbook destroyed by fire for Æthelfrith, dux, confirmation of 20 hides (cassati) at Wrington, Somerset.	Latin with English bounds, Glastonbury	Edward the Elder
372	613		A.D. 904 (Bickleigh, Devon)		Denewulf, bishop of Winchester, and his familia	Grant of 38 hides (manentes) at Bishops Waltham, Hampshire, in exchange for 40 hides (cassati) at Portchester, Hampshire	Latin, Winchester, Old Minster	Edward the Elder
373	612		A.D. 904 (Bickleigh, Devon)		Denewulf, bishop, and his familia at Winchester	Grant of privileges for the monastery at Taunton, Somerset, in exchange for 10 hides (manentes) at Crowcombe, 20 at Compton, 20 at Banwell, Somerset; and 20 at Stoce by Shalbourne, Wiltshire	Latin, Winchester, Old Minster	Edward the Elder
374	604		A.D. 904 (Bickleigh, Devon)		St Peter's Minster, Winchester	Grant of 10 hides (mansae) at Micheldever, Hampshire	Latin with bounds in Old English, Middle English and Latin, Winchester, New Minster	Edward the Elder
375	623		A.D. 909		Frithestan, bishop of Winchester	Confirmation of title to 40 hides (mansiones) at Alresford, Hampshire	Latin, Winchester, Old Minster	Edward the Elder
376	620		A.D. 909		Frithestan, bishop of Winchester	Confirmation of the beneficial hidation of Chilcomb, Hampshire, in return for the bishop's confirmation to the king of leases for 100 hides at Downton, Wiltshire, and 70 hides at Beddington, Surrey; with a note that Nursling and Chilbolton, Hampshire, shall be reckoned as part of Chilcomb.	Latin with English bounds, Winchester, Old Minster	Edward the Elder
377	625		A.D. 909		Winchester Cathedral	Confirmation of 20 hides (mansae) at Overton, with woodland at Tadley, 15 hides at North Waltham and 5 at Bradley, Hampshire	Latin with English bounds, Winchester, Old Minster	Edward the Elder
378	624		A.D. 909		the familia of St Peter's, Winchester	Confirmation of 50 hides (manentes) at Whitchurch, Hampshire, previously granted by Hemele, comes. With bounds of Whitchurch and Ashmanworth, Hampshire, and a note, in English, that Ashmanworth is to belong to the familia after King Edward's death.	Latin with English and English bounds, Winchester, Old Minster	Edward the Elder
379	635		A.D. 921 (Wilton, Wilts, 11 Jan)		Wulfgar, minister	Grant of 10 hides (cassatae) at Collingbourne Kingston, Wiltshire	Latin with bounds in Old English, Middle English and Latin, Winchester, New Minster	Edward the Elder
380	610		A.D. 899 x 909		Asser, bishop of Sherborne, and his familia	Grant of 6 hides (manentes) at Wellington, 5 at West Buckland and 12 at Bishops Lydeard, Somerset, in exchange for the minster at Plympton, Devon.	Latin with English bounds, Wells	Edward the Elder
381	629		No date.		Winchester Cathedral	Confirmation of 20 hides (manentes) at Crawley and 8 at Hunton, Hampshire, with appurtenant land at Ticcenesfelda wicum (in Ampfield, Hampshire).	Latin with English bounds, Winchester, Old Minster	Edward the Elder
382	627		No date.		Winchester Cathedral	Confirmation of 60 hides (manentes) at Farnham, Surrey, and 10 at Bentley, Hampshire	Latin with English bounds, Winchester, Old Minster	Edward the Elder
383	628		No date.		Winchester Cathedral	Confirmation of 10 hides (manentes) at Highclere, Hampshire	Latin with English bounds, Winchester, Old Minster	Edward the Elder
384	593		No date.		the familia of Winchester Cathedral	Confirmation of 50 hides (manentes) at Hurstbourne (Priors) and 10 at Stoke, Hampshire	Latin, Winchester, Old Minster	Edward the Elder
385	622		circa A.D. 909		Bishop Denewulf	Lease, for three lives, of 20 hides at Tichborne, Hampshire, with an annual food-render and reversion to the church of Winchester.	English with bounds, Winchester, Old Minster	Edward the Elder
386	724		A.D. 670 for 924 x 939		the minster of SS Mary and Peter, Exeter	Grant of 5 hides (cassati) at Culmstock, Devon.	Latin with English bounds, Exeter	Æthelstan
387	726		A.D. 670 for 924 x 939		the minster of SS Mary and Peter, Exeter	Grant of 1 hide (mansa) at Monkton (lost) in Wyke in Shobrooke and Thorverton, Devon.	Latin with English bounds, Exeter	Æthelstan
388	725		A.D. 670 for 924 x 939		St Petroc's minster	Grant of 1 hide (cassatus) at Newton St Petroc, Devon.	Latin with English bounds, Exeter	Æthelstan
389	723		A.D. 670 for 924 x 939		the minster of St Mary, Exeter	Grant of 6 perticae at Stoke Canon, Devon.	Latin with English bounds, Exeter	Æthelstan
390			A.D. 670 for 924 x 939		the monastery of SS Mary and Peter, Exeter	Grant of 5 hides (cassati) at Stoke (Stoke Canon, Devon).	Latin with English bounds, Exeter	Æthelstan
391	738		A.D. 843 for 934 (Dorchester, Dorset, 2nd day of Easter)		Milton Abbey	Grant of 26 hides at Milborne (St Andrew), 5 at Woolland, 3 at the mouth of the river Frome, i.e. at Ye (St Helen's, now Green Island), and at Ower, 3 at Clyffe in Tincleton, 3.5 at Lyscombe, 1 at Burleston, 1 at Little Puddle, 5 at Cattistock, 6 at Compton Abbas, 2 at Whitcombe, 5 at Osmington, 6 at Holworth, all in Dorset; and a weir at Twynham (Christchurch), Hampshire; river rights at Weymouth, Dorset; and 30 hides at Sydling, 2 at Chalmington and 6 at Hillfield, Dorset; and 10 at Ercecombe (Yarcombe) or Stokelonde (Stockland), Devon.	Latin and English versions, Milton	Æthelstan
392	746		A.D. 850 for 939 or 940		Byrhtelm, miles	Grant of 5 hides (cassati) at Eatun.	Latin, Burton	Æthelstan
393	690		A.D. 905 for 931 x 934		the see of Winchester	Confirmation of 100 hides (mansae) at Downton, Wiltshire	Latin with English bounds, Winchester, Old Minster	Æthelstan
394	641		A.D. 925 (4 Sept)		St Augustine	Restoration of 14 sulungs (aratra) at Werburginland in Thanet, Kent.	Latin, Canterbury, St Augustine's	Æthelstan
395	642		A.D. 925		Eadric, minister	Grant of 7 hides (manentes) at Hwituntune (? Whittington, near Chesterfield, Derbyshire), the earlier landbook being unavailable.	Latin, Burton	Æthelstan
396	659		A.D. 926		Ealdred, minister	Confirmation of 5 hides (manentes) at Chalgrave and Tebworth, Bedfordshire, formerly purchased from the Danes for 10 pounds of gold and silver.	Latin with English bounds, Abingdon	Æthelstan
397	658		A.D. 926		Uhtred	Confirmation of 60 hides (manentes) at Hope and Ashford, Derbyshire, formerly purchased from the Danes for 20 pounds of gold and silver.	Latin, Burton	Æthelstan
398	660		A.D. 927		Christ Church, Canterbury	Grant of land at Folkestone, Kent, the site of a former minster.	Latin, Canterbury, Christ Church	Æthelstan
399	664		A.D. 928 (Exeter, Easter Day, 16 April)		Ælfflæd	Grant of 20 hides (mansiones) at Winterburna.	Latin with English bounds, Glastonbury	Æthelstan
400	663		A.D. 928 (Exeter, Easter Day, 16 April)		Byrhtferth, minister	Grant of 12 hides (mansiones) at Odstock, Wiltshire	Latin with English bounds, Winchester, Old Minster	Æthelstan
401	665		A.D. 929		the church of St Mary, Worcester	Grant of land at Aust, Gloucestershire, for a fishery.	Latin with English bounds, Worcester	Æthelstan
402	666		A.D. 929		the church of St Mary, Worcester	Grant of 5 hides (cassati) at Water Eaton, Oxfordshire	Latin with English bounds, Worcester	Æthelstan
403	669		A.D. 930 (3 April, Lyminster, Sussex)		Beornheah, bishop (of Selsey)	Grant of 4 hides (cassatae) at Medmerry, with woodland at Earnley and meadow outside Chichester, Sussex.	Latin with English bounds, Selsey	Æthelstan
404	667		A.D. 930		Cynath, abbot	Grant of 10 hides (mansiunculae) at Dumbleton, Gloucestershire, with 2 hides at Aston Somerville, Worcestershire, and woodland at Fleferth (? Kington, near Flyford Flavell,Worcestershire). With a note, in Latin, recording King Edgar's confirmation of the land to Osulf, bishop of Ramsbury (A.D. 959 x 970).	Latin with English bounds, Abingdon	Æthelstan
405	1343		A.D. 930 (Chippenham, Wilts, 29 April)		Eadulf, bishop and the familia at Crediton	Grant of 3 hides (cassatae) at Sandford near Crediton, Devon.	Latin with English bounds, Exeter (ex Crediton)	Æthelstan
406	700		A.D. 930		Worcester minster	Grant of land at Clifton-upon-Teme, Worcestershire	Latin, Worcester	Æthelstan
407	703		A.D. 930 for 934 (Nottingham, 7 June)		the church of St Peter, York	Grant of land at Amounderness, Lancashire	Latin with bounds, York	Æthelstan
408	681		A.D. 931		the church of St Mary, Abingdon	Grant of 15 hides (cassati) at Sandford, Oxfordshire	Latin, Abingdon	Æthelstan
409	683		A.D. 931		the church of St Mary, Abingdon	Grant of 12 hides (cassati) at Shellingford, Berkshire	Latin, Abingdon	Æthelstan
410	680		A.D. 931		the church of St Mary, Abingdon	Grant of 5 hides (cassati) at Swinford, Berkshire	Latin, Abingdon	Æthelstan
411	682		circa A.D. 935 x 938 (? 937)		Ælfheah, minister	Grant of 10 hides (manentes) at Farnborough, Berkshire	Latin with English bounds, Abingdon	Æthelstan
412	674		A.D. 931 (Colchester, Essex, 23 March)		Ælfric, abbot	Grant of 10 hides (cassatae) æt Clere (Ecchinswell, Hampshire).	Latin with English bounds, Winchester, Old Minster	Æthelstan
413	675		A.D. 931 (Worthy, Hants, 20 June)		Ælfric, minister	Grant of 20 hides (cassati) at Watchfield, Berkshire	Latin with English bounds, Abingdon	Æthelstan
414	670		A.D. 931		the familia of St Peter's, Bath	Grant of 10 hides (mansae) at Priston, Somerset, and 5 at Cold Ashton, Gloucestershire, forfeited by Alfred for conspiracy.	Latin with English bounds, Bath	Æthelstan
415	671		A.D. 931		the familia and church of Malmesbury	Grant of 5 hides (mansae) at Norton, Wiltshire; 5 at Sumerford (? Little Somerford, Wiltshire); and 5 at Ewen, Gloucestershire, forfeited by Alfred for conspiracy.	Latin, Malmesbury	Æthelstan
416	677		A.D. 931 (Lifton, Devon, 12 November)		Wulfgar, minister	Grant of 9 hides (cassatae) at Ham, Wiltshire	Latin with English bounds, Winchester, Old Minster	Æthelstan
417	689		A.D. 932 (Milton, ? Kent, 30 August)		Æthelgeard (or Æthelweard), minister	Grant of 12 hides (cassatae) at (West) Meon, Hampshire	Latin with English bounds, Winchester, Old Minster	Æthelstan
418	692		A.D. 932 (Amesbury, Wilts, 24 December)		Alfred, minster	Grant of 12 hides (cassatae) at North Stoneham, Hampshire	Latin with bounds in Old English, Middle English and Latin, Winchester, New Minster	Æthelstan
418a			A.D. 932 (Exeter, 9 November)		Beorhtsige, abbot	Grant of 10 hides (cassatae) at Bowers Gifford, Essex.	Latin, Barking	Æthelstan
419	691		A.D. 932 (Amesbury, Wilts, 24 December)		Shaftesbury Abbey	Grant of 11.5 hides (cassatae) at Fontmell, Dorset.	Latin with English bounds, Shaftesbury	Æthelstan
420	697		A.D. 933 (Kingston-on-Thames, Surrey, 16 December)		the familia of Chertsey Minster	Confirmation of land at Chertsey, Thorpe, Egham, Chobham, Frimley, Weybridge, Woodham in Chertsey, Whone Waldesham (i.e. Hundulsham, lost, in Weybridge), Getinges (cf. Eaton Farm, Chobham), Molesey, Petersham, Tooting, Streatham, Mitcham, Sutton, Thunderfield, Carshalton (Euualtone), Beddington, Waddington, Coulsdon, Chipstead, Merstham, Chaldon, Banstead with Suthmeresfelda (Canon's Farm, Banstead), Cheam, Cuddington, Ewell, Epsom, Tadworth, Bookham, Effingham, East Clandon, Cobham, Pointers in Cobham, Albury, West Clandon, Byfleet, Dritham, Bisley, all in Surrey; and White Waltham, Berkshire	Latin, Chertsey	Æthelstan
421	694		A.D. 933		the bishopric of Crediton	Grant of privileges, in return for 60 pounds of silver.	Latin, Exeter (ex Crediton)	Æthelstan
422	695		A.D. 933 (Chippenham, Wilts, 26 Jan)		the familia of Sherborne Minster	Grant of 10 hides (cassatae) at Bradford Abbas, Dorset.	Latin with English bounds, Sherborne	Æthelstan
423	696		A.D. 933 (Chippenham, Wilts, 26 Jan)		the church of Sherborne	Grant of 5 or 8 hides (familiae) at Stalbridge Weston, Dorset.	Latin with English bounds, Sherborne	Æthelstan
424	699		A.D. 933		St Mary's Minster, Wilton	Grant of 10 hides (manentes) at North Newnton and 5 hides (cassati) at Oare in Wilcot, in Savernake Forest, Wiltshire	Latin with English bounds, Wilton	Æthelstan
425	702		A.D. 934 (Winchester, 28 May)		Ælfwald, minister	Grant of 12 hides (cassatae) at Derantune (probably Durrington, Sussex).	Latin with English bounds, Canterbury, Christ Church	Æthelstan
426	704		A.D. 934 (Buckingham, 13 Sept)		Æthelhelm, his faithful minister	Grant of 15 hides (cassatae) at Kingtone (? Kington St Michael, Wiltshire).	Latin, Glastonbury	Æthelstan
427	705		A.D. 934 (Frome, Somerset, 16 Decirca)		the familia of Holy Trinity, Winchester	Grant of 30 hides (cassatae) at Enford, Wiltshire; 10 (mansae) at Chilbolton and 10 (cassati) at Ashmanworth, Hampshire Latin version has English bounds of Enford, Hampshire	Latin and English versions with English bounds, Winchester, Old Minster	Æthelstan
428	701		A.D. 930 for 934 (London, 7 June)		St Mary's, Worcester	Grant of 5 hides (manentes) at Werstfelda, 5 (cassati) at Cofton Hackett, 5 at Rednal in Kings Norton, 2 at Wast Hills and Hopwood in Alvechurch, all in Worcestershire; and 3 at Wihtlafesfeld.	Latin, Worcester	Æthelstan
429	708		A.D. 935		the nuns of Shaftesbury	Grant of 12 hides (manentes) at Tarrant Hinton, Dorset.	Latin with English bounds, Shaftesbury	Æthelstan
430	707		A.D. 935		Wihtgar, minister	Lease, for four lives, of 7 hides (mansae) at Havant, Hampshire	Latin with English bounds, Winchester, Old Minster	Æthelstan
431	709		A.D. 936		Æthelhelm, his faithful minister	Grant of 10 hides (manentes) at Marksbury, Somerset.	Latin with English bounds, Glastonbury	Æthelstan
432	715		A.D. 937		the church at Athelney	Grant of 1 hide (mansio) at (East) Lyng, Somerset.	Latin with English bounds, Athelney	Æthelstan
433	721		A.D. 670 (? for 937) or 937		the minster of St Peter (MS 1	St Mary in MSS 2 and 3), Exeter; grant of 1 hide (mansa) at Topsham, Devon.	Latin with English bounds, Exeter	Æthelstan
434	716		A.D. 937 (Dorchester, Dorset, 21 Decirca)		the familia of Malmesbury	Grant of 60 hides (cassati) at Bremhill, Wiltshire	Latin, Malmesbury	Æthelstan
435	718		A.D. 937 (Dorchester, Dorset, 21 Decirca)		the familia of Malmesbury	Grant of 10 hides (cassati) at Wootton, Wiltshire	Latin, Malmesbury	Æthelstan
436	719		A.D. 937 (Dorchester, Dorset, 21 Decirca)		the familia of Malmesbury	Grant of 10 hides (cassati) at Wootton, 60 at Bremhill, 5 at Sumerford (? Little Somerford), and 5 at Norton, Wiltshire; and 5 at Ewen, Gloucestershire	Latin, Malmesbury	Æthelstan
437	712		A.D. 937		Sigulf	Grant of 5 hides (manentes) at Water Newton, Huntingdonshire	Latin with English bounds, Thorney	Æthelstan
438	714		A.D. 937		the church of St Mary, Wilton	Grant of 6 hides (mansae) at Burcombe, Wiltshire	Latin with English bounds, Wilton	Æthelstan
439	713		A.D. 937		the church of SS Peter and Paul, Winchester	Confirmation of the beneficial hidation of Chilcomb, Hampshire	Latin, Winchester, Old Minster	Æthelstan
440	729		A.D. 938		Ælfheah, minister	Grant of 16 hides (mansae) at Pitminster, Somerset, in return for 200 staterae of gold and silver.	Latin with English bounds, Winchester, Old Minster	Æthelstan
441	730		A.D. 938		Æthelred, minister	Grant of 5 hides (mansae) at Rimpton, Somerset.	Latin with English bounds, Winchester, Old Minster	Æthelstan
442	728		A.D. 938		Athelstan, comes	Grant of 6 hides (mansae) at Uplyme, Devon.	Latin with English bounds, Glastonbury	Æthelstan
443	727		A.D. 938		Frithestan, bishop of Winchester	Confirmation of privileges and of a grant to Taunton of 4 hides (mansae) at Withiel Florey, Somerset, and 3 at Cearn (? Charmouth, Dorset).	Latin with English bounds, Winchester, Old Minster	Æthelstan
444	731		A.D. 938		Old Minster, Winchester	Grant of 25 hides (mansae) at Tichborne and 5 at Beauworth, Hampshire, to remain forever under episcopal control.	Latin with English bounds, Winchester, Old Minster	Æthelstan
445	744		A.D. 939		Ælfric or Alfred, bishop	Grant of 5 hides (mansae) at West Orchard, Dorset, with regrant by Alfred to Beorhtwyn, daughter of Wulfhelm.	Latin with English bounds, Shaftesbury	Æthelstan
446	742		A.D. 939		Eadburh, his sister	Grant of 17 hides (mansae) at Droxford, Hampshire	Latin with English bounds, Winchester, Old Minster	Æthelstan
447	741		A.D. 939		Eadwulf, minister	Grant of 12 hides (mansae) at Meopham, Kent.	Latin with English bounds, Canterbury, Christ Church	Æthelstan
448	743		A.D. 939		Eadwulfu, a nun	Grant of 15 hides (mansae) at Brightwalton, Berkshire	Latin with English bounds, Abingdon	Æthelstan
449	734		A.D. 939		Wulfswith, ancilla Dei	Grant of 15 hides (mansae) at East Overton, Wiltshire	Latin with English bounds, Winchester, Old Minster	Æthelstan
450	785		A.D. 943 for 924 x 939 (Kingston-on-Thames, Surrey, 6 Oct)		the church of St Buryan	Grant of 1 hide (mansa) in seven places (at Pendrea, Bosanketh, Botilwoelon, Treikyn, Bosliven and Treverven, Cornwall, with land at Burnewhall).	Latin with bounds, Exeter	Æthelstan
451	644		A.D. 925 (for 927 x 939)		St John's, Beverley	Grant of privileges.	English, Beverley	Æthelstan
452	735		A.D. 924 x 939		St Paul's minster	Confirmation of privileges.	Latin and English versions, London, St Paul's	Æthelstan
453	737		A.D. 924 x 939		St Paul's minster, London	Confirmation of privileges, and 10 hides (mansae) at Sandon with Rothe (Roe Green in Sandon), 8 at Ardeley with Luffenhall, Hertfordshire; 10 at Belchamp St Pauls with Wickham St Pauls, 8 at Heybridge, 12 at Runwell, 30 in the Sokens, Essex; 10 at West Drayton, Middlesex; 8 at Barnes, Surrey; 10 at Neasden with Willesden, Middlesex	Latin, London, St Paul's	Æthelstan
454	720		A.D. 924 x 939		the burgesses of Malmesbury	Grant of privileges and 5 hides near Norton, Wiltshire	Latin, Borough of Malmesbury	Æthelstan
455			A.D. 934 x 939		Muchelney Abbey and the brethren there	Grant of land at Curry Rivel, 5 hides (mansae) at Stowey in Fivehead, Somerset, and 1 hide held by a layman, Muda. The grant is entered in a gospel-book.	Latin with English bounds, Muchelney	Æthelstan
456	646		A.D. 927 x 939			Writ of King Athelstan; for church and chapter of Ripon.	Latin, Ripon	Æthelstan
457	647		No date.			Rhyming English version of S 456.	English, Ripon	Æthelstan
458	745		A.D. 924 x 939 (probably 934 x 935)		Wulfsige, minister	Grant of 20 hides (cassatae) at Chilmark, Wiltshire	Latin, Wilton	Æthelstan
459	754		A.D. 940		Adulf (Eadwulf)	Grant of 10 hides (mansae) at Liddington, Wiltshire	Latin with English bounds, Shaftesbury	Edmund
460	759		A.D. 940		Ælfhild, his kinswoman	Grant of 15 hides (mansae) at Culham, Oxfordshire	Latin, Abingdon	Edmund
461	762		A.D. 940		Ælfsige, minister	Grant of 30 hides (mansae) at Waltham, Berkshire	Latin with English bounds, Abingdon	Edmund
462	749		A.D. 940		Elswithe, his kinsman and faithful minister	Grant of 20 hides (mansae) at Batcombe, Somerset.	Latin with English bounds, Glastonbury	Edmund
463	758		A.D. 940		Æthelgeard, minister	Grant of 12 hides (mansae) at Exton, Hampshire, with note, in English, of grant by King Eadred to Æthelgeard, thegn, of a mill and messuage (haga) at Winchester.	Latin with English bounds, Winchester, Old Minster	Edmund
464	753		A.D. 940		Æthelswith, a nun	Grant of 10 hides (mansae) at Oswaldingtune (near Ashford, Kent).	Latin with English bounds, Canterbury, Christ Church	Edmund
465	763		A.D. 940		Æthelthryth, a nun	Grant of 5 hides (mansae) at Poolhampton in Overton, Hampshire	Latin with English bounds, Winchester, Old Minster	Edmund
466	752		A.D. 940		Dunstan, his faithful abbot	Grant of 20 hides (mansae) at Christian Malford, Wiltshire	Latin with English bounds, Glastonbury	Edmund
467	764		A.D. 940		Eadric, minister	Lease, for four lives, of 4 hides (mansae) at Wotton-under-Edge, Gloucestershire	Latin with English bounds, Winchester, Old Minster	Edmund
468	756		A.D. 940		Garulf, minister	Grant of 9 hides (mansae) at Swallowcliffe, Wiltshire	Latin with English bounds, Wilton	Edmund
469	757		A.D. 940		Ordwold, minister	Renewal of lost landbook for 10 hides (mansae) at Wylye, Wiltshire, held by Ordwold's father, Ordlaf. With a note, in English, of appurtenances, including a messuage (haga) in Wilton.	Latin with English and English bounds, Wilton	Edmund
470	748		A.D. 940		New Minster, Winchester	Grant of 30 hides (mansae) at Pewsey, Wiltshire	Latin with bounds in Old English, Middle English and Latin, Winchester, New Minster	Edmund
471	761		A.D. 940 (? for 943)		Wulfric, minister	Grant of 15 hides (mansae) at Garford, Berkshire	Latin with English bounds, Abingdon	Edmund
472	750		A.D. 940 (Colchester, Essex)		Wulfric, his minister	Grant of 25 hides (manentes) at Grittleton, Wiltshire	Latin with English bounds, Glastonbury	Edmund
473	751		A.D. 940 (Chippenham, Wilts)		Wulfric	Grant of 30 hides (mansiunculae) at Langley, Wiltshire	Latin with English bounds, Glastonbury	Edmund
474	768		A.D. 941		Ælfflæd, a religious woman	Grant of 15 hides (mansae) at Buckland (Newton) and Plush, Dorset.	Latin with English bounds, Glastonbury	Edmund
475	770		A.D. 941		Ælfheah, minister	Grant of 16 hides (mansae) at Pitminster, Somerset.	Latin with English bounds, Winchester, Old Minster	Edmund
476	767		A.D. 941		Æthelnoth, minister	Grant of 10 hides (mansae) at Corston, Somerset.	Latin with English bounds, Bath	Edmund
477	766		A.D. 941	King Edmund, with Eadred his brother and Eadwig his son	Christ Church, Canterbury	Restoration of land at Twickenham, Middlesex; Preston near Faversham, Wingham, Swarling, Bossington, Graveney and Ulcombe, Kent; with reference to grant by King Athelstan to Christ Church, Canterbury, of land at Tarring, Sussex.	Latin, Canterbury, Christ Church	Edmund
478	769		A.D. 941		Eadric, his vassallus	Grant of 2 hides (mansae) at Beechingstoke, Wiltshire	Latin with English bounds, Shaftesbury	Edmund
479	771		A.D. 942 (Winchcombe, Gloucs)		Wulfsige the Black	Grant of 40 hides at Alrewas, Bromley (cf. Kings and Abbots Bromley), Barton, Tatenhill, Branston, Stretton, Rolleston, Clifton and Haunton, Staffordshire	Latin, Burton	Edmund
480	777		A.D. 942		Athelstan, comes	Grant of 10 hides (mansae) at Ærmundeslea and a vill at Appleton, Berkshire	Latin with English bounds, Abingdon	Edmund
481	776		A.D. 942		Athelstan, his faithful comes	Grant of 20 hides (mansae) at Mells, Somerset.	Latin with English bounds, Glastonbury	Edmund
482	778		A.D. 942		Sæthryth, a nun	Grant of 11 hides (mansae) at Winkfield [and at Swinley], Berkshire	Latin with English bounds, Abingdon	Edmund
483	774		A.D. 942		Theodred, bishop of London	Grant of land at Southery, Norfolk.	Latin, Bury St Edmunds	Edmund
484	772		A.D. 942		Wulfsige the Black	Grant of land at Walton-on-Trent, Coton in the Elms, Cauldwell, Drakelow, Derbyshire; Newbold in Barton-under-Needwood, Staffordshire; and Linton, Derbyshire	Latin, Burton	Edmund
485	775		A.D. 942		Wynflæd, a nun	Restoration and confirmation of 7 hides (mansae) at Cheselbourne, Dorset, and grant of a further 8 hides there; with note, in English, of grant to Wynflæd of land in Winterbourne Tomson, Dorset.	Latin with English bounds, Shaftesbury	Edmund
486	788		A.D. 943		Ælfsige, minister	Grant of 20 hides (mansae) at Moredon in Rodbourne Cheney, Wiltshire	Latin with English bounds, Winchester, Old Minster	Edmund
487	787		A.D. 943		Ælfswith, a religious woman	Grant of 15 hides (mansae) at Burghclere, Hampshire	Latin with English bounds, Winchester, Old Minster	Edmund
488	786		A.D. 943		Æthelgeard, minister	Grant of 7 hides (mansae) at Tisted, Hampshire, and note, in English, of grant by King Eadred to Æthelgeard of a messuage (haga) in Winchester.	Latin with English bounds, Winchester, Old Minster	Edmund
489	784		A.D. 943		his mother [Eadgifu]	Grant of 10 sulungs at North Mynstre, Thanet, Kent.	Latin with English bounds, Canterbury, Christ Church	Edmund
490	781		A.D. 943		Eadric, comes	Grant of 11 hides (mansae) at Mapperton in Almer, Dorset.	Latin with English bounds, Shaftesbury	Edmund
491	789		A.D. 943		Eadric, minister	Grant of 10 hides (mansae) at Leckhampstead, and a mill on the river Lambourn, Berkshire	Latin with English bounds, Abingdon	Edmund
492	782		A.D. 943		Wulfgar, minister	Grant of 10 hides (mansae) at South Newton, Wiltshire, with meadow at Weolces clife, and 3 hides at Frustfield (lost), Wiltshire	Latin with English bounds, Wilton	Edmund
493	795		A.D. 944		Ælfgyth, a nun	Grant of 3 hides (mansae) at Rollington (lost) in Bulbridge, near Wilton, Wiltshire	Latin with English bounds, Wilton	Edmund
494	798		A.D. 944		Ælfheah, minister	Grant of 6 hides (mansae) at Lyford, Berkshire	Latin with English bounds, Abingdon	Edmund
495	792		A.D. 944		Ælfric, bishop (of Ramsbury)	Grant of 30 hides (mansae) at Badby, Dodford and Everdon, Northamptonshire	Latin with English bounds, Evesham	Edmund
496	801		A.D. 944 (? for 942)		Ælfric, bishop (of Ramsbury)	Grant of 100 hides (mansae) at Blewbury, Berkshire	Latin with English bounds, Abingdon	Edmund
497	791		A.D. 944		Ælfstan, minister	Grant of 12 hides (mansae) or sulungs at Ealdingtune (? Monkton) in Thanet, Kent.	Latin with English bounds, Canterbury, Christ Church	Edmund
498	799		A.D. 944		Athelstan, his faithful comes	Grant of 2 hides (mansae) at Brampford Speke, Devon, in return for 80 mancuses of gold.	Latin with English bounds, Glastonbury	Edmund
499	794		A.D. 944		the church of St Mary, Glastonbury, and to Abbot Dunstan	Grant and confirmation of privileges.	Latin, Glastonbury	Edmund
500	802		A.D. 944		Ordulf, his minister	Grant of 8 hides (mansae) at Brimpton, Berkshire, in return for 90 mancuses of purest gold.	Latin with English bounds, Abingdon	Edmund
501	755		A.D. 944		Sigeric, his minister	Grant of 2 sulungs (aratra) at Sibertswold, Kent.	Latin with English bounds, Canterbury, St Augustine's	Edmund
502	793		A.D. 944		Wulfgar, minister	Grant of 5 hides (mansae) at Hinton St Mary, Dorset.	Latin with English bounds, Shaftesbury	Edmund
503	796		A.D. 944		Wulfric, minister	Grant of 20 hides at Æscesbyrig (i.e. Woolstone, Berkshire).	Latin with English bounds, Winchester, Old Minster	Edmund
504	800		A.D. 944		Wulfric, minister	Grant of 20 hides (mansae) at Nettleton, Wiltshire	Latin with English bounds, Glastonbury	Edmund
505	803		A.D. 945 (30 March)		Æthelnoth, his presbyter	Grant of a monastic dwelling (mansio) at Basing and 2 hides (cassati) at Lickpit, with appurtenant woodland at Oakridge and further appurtenances at Binfields, and at Middesellum (all Hampshire, except perhaps Middesellum), in return for 50 solidi of gold.	Latin, uncertain (? Winchester New Minster)	Edmund
506	807		A.D. 945		Alfred, bishop (of Selsey)	Grant of 4 hides (mansae) at Bracklesham and 2 at Thorney (cf. Thorney Farm in East Wittering) or Earnley, Sussex.	Latin, Selsey	Edmund
507	808		A.D. 945		the monastery at Baederices wirde	Grant of privileges in adjacent land.	Latin with English bounds, Bury St Edmunds	Edmund
508	814		A.D. 946		Æthelhere, his faithful minister	Grant of 5 hides (mansae) at Weston near Bath, Somerset, on condition that he and his heirs remain faithful to Edmund until the king's death and thereafter transfer their loyalty to a designated friend (amicus) of the king.	Latin with English bounds, Bath	Edmund
509	816		A.D. 946		Æthelnoth, his minister	Grant or lease of 5 hides (mansae) at North Wootton, Somerset, burdened with annual renders to St Mary's, Glastonbury.	Latin with English bounds, Glastonbury	Edmund
510	813		A.D. 946		Ordhelm and Ælfwold, his men	Grant of a 'yokelet' (an iuclæte) and 10 segetes at Gamelanwyrthe, Kent.	Latin with English bounds, Canterbury, Christ Church	Edmund
511	765		A.D. 960 ? for 941		Æthelgeard, minister	Grant of 7 hides (mansae) at Tisted, Hampshire	Latin with English bounds, Winchester, Old Minster	Edmund
512	780		A.D. 943		Ælfstan, minister	Grant of 6 hides (mansae), equated with 6 sulungs, at Miclan grafe in Thanet, Kent.	Latin with English bounds, Canterbury, Christ Church	Edmund
513	817		A.D. 944 x 946		Æthelflæd, his queen	Grant, for life, of 100 hides at Damerham and Martin, Hampshire, and Pentridge, Dorset; with reversion to St Mary's, Glastonbury.	Latin with English bounds, Glastonbury	Edmund
514	779		A.D. 942 x 946		Burhric, bishop (of Rochester)	Grant of 3 sulungs (aratra) at West Malling, Kent.	Latin with English bounds, Rochester	Edmund
515	811		(A.D. 946)		Christ Church (Canterbury)	Restoration of land at Twickenham, Middlesex; Preston, Ealdingtun (? Monkton in Thanet), Swarling, Wingham, Kent; Graveney, Bossington, Ulcombe and Tarring, Sussex.	Latin, Canterbury, Christ Church	Edmund
516	894		A.D. 903 for 946 x 951		Wulfsige, bishop (of Sherborne)	Grant of 8 hides (cassati) at Thornford, Dorset, with reversion to the refectory of the cathedral community.	Latin with English bounds, Sherborne	Eadred
517	810		A.D. 945		Æthelgeard, his faithful minister	Grant of 10 hides (mansae) at Brightwell, 15 at Sotwell, 5 at Mackney, and land at Wallingford, Berkshire	Latin with English bounds, Winchester, Old Minster	Eadred
517a			A.D. 946		Æthelgifu, a religious woman	Grant of 4 hides (mansae) at Tolleshunt, Essex.	Latin, Barking	Eadred
517b			A.D. 946		Eawyn, a religious woman	Grant of 19 hides (mansae) at Hockley, Essex.	Latin, Barking	Eadred
518	874		A.D. 946		Heresige, his man	Grant of 1.5 hides (mansae) at Swalecliffe, Kent, with grant of the same by Heresige to the church of SS Peter and Paul (St Augustine's, Canterbury).	Latin with English bounds, Canterbury, St Augustine's	Eadred
519	818		A.D. 946		Wulfric, his faithful minister	Grant of 5 hides (mansae) at Didlington, Dorset.	Latin with English bounds, Wilton	Eadred
520	815		A.D. 946		Wulfric	Grant of 7 hides (manentes) at Warkton, Northamptonshire	Latin, Worcester	Eadred
521	831		A.D. 947		the church of SS Peter and Paul, Winchester	Restoration of 130 hides at Taunton, Somerset.	Latin, Winchester, Old Minster	Eadred
522	832		A.D. 947		Ælfsige, his faithful man	Grant of 5 hides (mansae) at Ebbesborne, Wiltshire	Latin with English bounds, Winchester, Old Minster	Eadred
522a			A.D. 947		Ælfstan, his faithful minister	Grant of 17 hides (mansae) at Wigborough, Essex.	Latin, Barking	Eadred
523	830		A.D. 947		Æthelgeard, his faithful minister and miles	Grant of 10 hides (mansae) at Brightwell, Berkshire	Latin with English bounds, Winchester, Old Minster	Eadred
524	828		A.D. 947		Eadric, his faithful comes	Grant of 20 hides (mansae) at Ashdown Park in Ashbury, Berkshire	Latin with English bounds, Glastonbury	Eadred
525	834		A.D. 947		Eadric, his faithful comes	Grant of 20 hides (mansae) at Washington, Sussex.	Latin with English bounds, Abingdon	Eadred
526	824		A.D. 947		Eadwulf, priest	Grant, for, life of 10 hides (mansae) at Leckford, Hampshire, with reversion of 5 hides to Nunnaminster in Winchester and 5 hides to the church where he is buried.	Latin with bounds in Old English, Middle English and Latin, Winchester, New Minster	Eadred
527	821		A.D. 947		Edmund, his faithful minister	Grant of 3 hides (mansae) at Hankham, Sussex.	Latin with English bounds, Wells	Eadred
528	820		A.D. 947		Oswig, minister	Grant of 20 hides (mansae) at Merstham, Surrey.	Latin with English bounds, Canterbury, Christ Church	Eadred
529	833		A.D. 947		Wulfric, miles	Grant of 5 hides (mansae) at Denchworth, Berkshire	Latin with English bounds, Abingdon	Eadred
530	829		A.D. 947		Wulfric, his faithful minister	Grant of 5 hides (mansae) at Idmiston, Wiltshire	Latin, Glastonbury	Eadred
531	870		A.D. 948		Ælfheah, his minister	Grant of 10 hides (mansae) at Knoyle, Wiltshire	Latin with English bounds, Wilton	Eadred
532	865		A.D. 948		Ælfric, his faithful minister	Grant of 11 hides (mansae) at Alverstoke, Hampshire	Latin with English bounds, Winchester, Old Minster	Eadred
533	871		A.D. 948		Ælfsige, his most faithful minister	Grant of 3 hides (mansae) at Ailsworth, Northamptonshire	Latin with English bounds, Peterborough	Eadred
534	868		A.D. 948		Ælfthryth, a religious woman	Grant of 8 hides (mansae) in the Isle of Purbeck, Dorset.	Latin with English bounds, Shaftesbury	Eadred
535	869		A.D. 948		Ælfwyn, a religious woman	Grant of 6 hides (mansae), equated with 6 sulungs, at Wickhambreux, Kent, in return for 2 pounds of purest gold.	Latin with English bounds, Canterbury, Christ Church	Eadred
536	864		A.D. 948		Æthelgeard, his faithful minister	Grant of 5 hides (mansae) at Mackney and 5 at Sotwell, Berkshire	Latin with English, Winchester, Old Minster	Eadred
537	860		A.D. 948 (Godeshylle, ? Gadshill, Kent)		Canterbury Cathedral	Grant of 30 hides (mansi) at Twickenham, Middlesex	Latin, Canterbury, Christ Church	Eadred
538	872		A.D. 948		Crowland Abbey	Confirmation of privileges and of land etcirca at Crowland, Spalding, Pinchbeck, Whaplode, Algarkirk, Dowdike, Drayton, Bucknall, Hallington, Gerimthorp, Langtoft, Deeping, Baston, Thetford, Rippingale, Laithorpe, Kirkby, Lincolnshire; Wellingborough, Addington, Elmington, Glapthorn, Worthorpe, Peakirk and Badby, Northamptonshire; Morborne, Huntingdonshire; Thurning, Northamptonshire (formerly Huntingdonshire); Beeby, Sutton, Stapleton, Leicestershire; Cottenham, Oakington and Dry Drayton, Cambridgeshire; and at Standon, Hertfordshire	Latin with bounds, Crowland	Eadred
540	862		A.D. 948		the church of SS Peter and Paul, Winchester	Confirmation of 55 hides (mansae) at Downton and 45 at Ebbesborne, Wiltshire	Latin with English bounds, Winchester, Old Minster	Eadred
541	867		A.D. 948		Wulfric, his faithful minister	Grant of 5 hides (mansae) at Idmiston, Wiltshire	Latin with English bounds, Glastonbury	Eadred
542	866		A.D. 948 (? for 947)		Wulfric, his minister and miles	Grant of 10 hides (mansae) at Stanmore in Beedon, Berkshire	Latin with English bounds, Abingdon	Eadred
543	879		A.D. 949		Ælfsige, gold- and silver-smith, his man	Grant of 1 hide (mansa) on the Isle of Wight and 1 at Winterburnan in the land of the Gewisse (? Wiltshire).	Latin with English bounds, Wilton	Eadred
544	883		A.D. 949		Æthelmær, praeses	Grant of 20 hides (manentes) at Chetwode and Hillesden, Buckinghamshire With note, in English, referring to Chadshunt, Warwickshire	Latin with English and English bounds, Abingdon	Eadred
545	885		A.D. 949		Athelstan, his faithful minister	Grant of 10 hides (mansi) at Eatun, in return for 60 mancuses of gold. Bounds incomplete.	Latin with English bounds, Burton	Eadred
546	880		A.D. 949		Canterbury Cathedral	Grant of Reculver minster and its lands, estimated at 26 hides (cassati).	Latin with English bounds, Canterbury, Christ Church	Eadred
547	875		A.D. 948		Frithuric, his minister	Grant of four hides (mansae) at Ofærtune.	Latin with English bounds, Winchester, Old Minster	Eadred
548	884		A.D. 949		Uhtred, dux and miles	Grant of land at Bakewell, Derbyshire	Latin, Burton	Eadred
549	876		A.D. 949 (Somerton, Somerset, Easter)		Ulfketel, miles	Grant of 4 hides (cassata) in Suthtone (? Sutton Maddock, Shropshire.), with licence to buy a fifth.	Latin, Burton	Eadred
550	882		A.D. 949		Wulfric, miles	Grant of 12 hides (cassati) at Bourton-on-the-Water, Gloucestershire, with bounds of 20 hides at Bourton, 7 hides at Maugersbury and 7 hides at Daylesford, Gloucestershire	Latin with English bounds, Evesham	Eadred
551	878		A.D. 949		Wulfric, his faithful minister and miles	Grant of 20 hides (mansae) at Merton, Surrey.	Latin, Glastonbury	Eadred
552	877		A.D. 949		Wulfric, his faithful man	Grant of 18 hides (mansae) at Welford, Berkshire, in exchange for land at Pendavey in Egloshayle, Cornwall.	Latin with English bounds, Abingdon	Eadred
552a			A.D. 950 (Abingdon, Berks)		the monastic community at Barking	Grant of 4 hides (manentes) at Lippanwelle (? in Barnstaple hundred) and 4 at Ciricdune (? at Chingford, Essex).	Latin, Barking	Eadred
553	887		A.D. 950		Glastonbury Abbey	Confirmation of the grant by King Edmund of 15 hides (cassati) at Pucklechurch, Gloucestershire	Latin with English bounds, Glastonbury	Eadred
554	891		A.D. 951		Ælfheah, his faithful minister	Grant of 8 hides (cassati) at Northtune.	Latin, Burton	Eadred
555	889		A.D. 951		Ælfhere, his kinsman	Grant of 20 hides (mansiunculae) at Buckland (Denham), Somerset.	Latin with English bounds, Glastonbury	Eadred
556	893		A.D. 951		Ælfsige, miles	Grant of 5 hides at Haddon, Huntingdonshire	Latin with English bounds, Thorney	Eadred
557	890		A.D. 951		Wulfhelm, miles	Grant of land at Marchington, Staffordshire	Latin with English bounds, Burton	Eadred
558	892		A.D. 951		Wulfric, his faithful minister	Grant of 25 hides (mansae) at Chieveley, Berkshire	Latin with English bounds, Abingdon	Eadred
559	895		A.D. 952 (for 953 x 955)		Ælfwine, vassalus	Grant of 3 hides (cassati) at Barkham, Berkshire	Latin with English bounds, Abingdon	Eadred
560	900		A.D. 953		Ælfric, his minister	Grant of 5 hides (cassati) at Curridge, Berkshire	Latin with English bounds, Abingdon	Eadred
561	899		A.D. 953		Ælfsige, minister, and his wife Eadgifu	Grant of 33 hides (cassati) at Æscesburh (Uffington, Berkshire).	Latin with English bounds, Abingdon	Eadred
562	898		A.D. 953		Eadgifu, famula Dei and his mother	Grant of 30 hides (mansiones) at Felpham, Sussex.	Latin with English bounds, Shaftesbury	Eadred
563	903		A.D. 955		Ælfgyth, a nun at Wilton	Grant of 20 hides (cassati) at (East) Pennard, Somerset, in return for 120 gold solidi.	Latin with English bounds, Glastonbury	Eadred
564	908		A.D. 955		Ælfheah, his kinsman and minister	Grant of 8 hides (cassati) at Compton Beauchamp, Berkshire	Latin with English bounds, Abingdon	Eadred
565	905		A.D. 955		Ælfsige, bishop of Winchester	Grant, for four lives, of 10 hides (mansiunculae) at Highclere, Hampshire, with reversion to St Peter's (Old Minster), Winchester.	Latin with English bounds, Winchester, Old Minster	Eadred
566	909		A.D. 955		Ælfsige Hunlafing, thegn	Grant of 5 hides at Alwalton, Huntingdonshire	English with bounds, Peterborough	Eadred
567	906		A.D. 955		Æthelwold, abbot	Grant of Abingdon, with 10 hides at Ginge, 10 at Goosey, 30 at Longworth and 30 at Cumnor, Berkshire With bounds of 20 hides at Abingdon.	Latin with English bounds, Abingdon	Eadred
568	904		A.D. 955		Dunstan, abbot	Grant of 25 hides (cassati) at Badbury, Wiltshire, in return for 150 gold solidi.	Latin with English bounds, Glastonbury	Eadred
569	911		A.D. 955		Uhtred Cild, pedissequus	Grant of land at Chesterfield, Derbyshire	Latin, Burton	Eadred
570	923		A.D. 956 for ? 953 x 955		Brihtric, minister	Grant of 5 hides (caracti) at Henstridge, Somerset.	Latin with English bounds, Shaftesbury	Eadred
571	931		A.D. 956		Brihtric, his minister	Grant of 5 hides (mansae) at Rimpton, Somerset.	Latin with English bounds, Winchester, Old Minster	Eadred
572	1346		A.D. 956 for 954 x 955		Ely Abbey	Grant of 15 hides (cassati) at Stapleford, Cambridgeshire, to be in the charge of Wulfstan, the king's sequipedus; with an additional grant of 3 hides at Bardfield in Stapleford and a mill and pasture at Derneforde (Dernford Farm, Cambridgeshire).	Latin, Ely	Eadred
573	910		A.D. 956		Wihtsige, minister	Grant of 16 hides (mansae) at Corfe and Blashenwell, Dorset.	Latin with English bounds, Shaftesbury	Eadred
574	987		A.D. 957		Wulfhelm, his minister	Grant of 5 hides (mansiunculae) at Little Aston and Great Barr, Staffordshire	Latin with English and English bounds, Winchester, Old Minster	Eadred
575	902		A.D. 958		Wulfric, his faithful minister	Grant of 20 hides (mansae) at Æscesbyrig (i.e. Woolstone, Berkshire).	Latin with English bounds, Winchester, Old Minster	Eadred
576	1021		A.D. 958	Eadred, king of Mercia	Wulfric, his devoted minister	Grant of 5 hides (mansae) at Austrey, Warwickshire	Latin, Burton	Eadred
577	1022		A.D. 958		Wulfric, his faithful minister	Grant of 10 hides (mansae) at Boxford, Berkshire	Latin with English bounds, Abingdon	Eadred
578	888		A.D. 946 x 951 (? 949)		Ælfgar, his faithful miles and minister	Grant of 3 hides (mansae) at Weonfelda (probably Wokefield, Berkshire).	Latin with English bounds, Abingdon	Eadred
579	1023		A.D. 951 x 955 (or 957 x 959)		Burhelm, his minister	Grant of 6 hides (mansae) at Old Swinford, Worcestershire	Latin with English bounds, Wells	Eadred
580	901		A.D. 946 x 955		Wulfheah, his man	Grant of 1 hide (mansa) at Little Langford, Wiltshire	Latin, Glastonbury	Eadred
581	975		A.D. 955 for 956		Brihtric, his minister	Grant of 10 hides (mansae) at Hendred, Berkshire	Latin, Abingdon	Eadwig
582	917		A.D. 955		the nuns of Wilton	Grant of 100 hides (mansiunculae) at Chalke, Wiltshire With an English passage added after the witness-list.	Latin with English and English bounds, Wilton	Eadwig
583	981		A.D. 956 (ii)		St Mary's Abbey, Abingdon	Grant of 10 hides (mansae) at Ginge, Berkshire	Latin with English bounds, Abingdon	Eadwig
584	967		A.D. 956 (iii)		St Mary's Abbey, Abingdon	Grant of 20 hides (mansae) at Tadmarton, Oxfordshire	Latin with English bounds, Abingdon	Eadwig
585	948		A.D. 956 (iii)		Ælfheah, his kinsman and faithful minister	Grant of 30 hides (mansae) at Ellendune (Wroughton), Wiltshire	Latin with English bounds, Winchester, Old Minster	Eadwig
586	1030		A.D. 956 for 959		Ælfheah, his kinsman and minister	Grant of 4 hides (mansi) on the river Nadder, Wiltshire	Latin with English bounds, Wilton	Eadwig
587	945		A.D. 956 (iv)		Ælfhere, his comes	Grant of 20 hides (mansi) at Cuddesdon, Oxfordshire	Latin with English bounds, Abingdon	Eadwig
588	946		A.D. 956 (iv)		Ælfhere, his comes	Grant of 10 hides (mansae) at Wormleighton, Warwickshire	Latin with English bounds, Abingdon	Eadwig
589	938		A.D. 956 (i)		Ælfric, his fidelis	Grant of 40 hides (mansae) at Alresford, Hampshire	Latin with English bounds, Winchester, Old Minster	Eadwig
590	932		A.D. 956 (ii)		Ælfric, his minister	Grant of 25 hides (cassati) at Bayworth, Berkshire	Latin with English bounds, Abingdon	Eadwig
591	942		A.D. 956 (iv)		Ælfsige, his fidelis	Grant of 25 hides (mansae) at Benham, Berkshire	Latin with English bounds, Abingdon	Eadwig
592	943		A.D. 956 (ii)		Ælfsige, his minister	Grant of 10 hides (cassati) at Kettering, Northamptonshire	Latin with English bounds, Peterborough	Eadwig
593	957		A.D. 956		Ælfswith, the faithful woman	Grant of 10 hides (mansae) at Corston, Somerset.	Latin with English bounds, Bath	Eadwig
594	935		A.D. 956 (i)		Ælfwine, his familiar	Grant of 15 hides (mansae) at Milton, Berkshire	Latin with English bounds, Abingdon	Eadwig
595	940		A.D. 956		Ælfwine, his faithful minister and miles	Grant of 10 hides (mansae) at Yaxley and 5 at Farcet, Huntingdonshire	Latin with English bounds, Thorney	Eadwig
596	960		A.D. 956 (ii)		Ælfwold, his faithful minister	Grant of 4 hides (mansae) at Withiel Florey, Somerset.	Latin with English bounds, Winchester, Old Minster	Eadwig
597	941		A.D. 956 (i)		Ælfric, his adoptivus parens	Grant of 20 hides (mansae) at Hanney, Berkshire	Latin with English bounds, Abingdon	Eadwig
598	976		A.D. 956 (ii)		Æthelgeard, his princeps	Grant of 10 hides (mansae) at Chidden in Hambledon, Hampshire	Latin with English bounds, Winchester, Old Minster	Eadwig
599	944		A.D. 956 (? ii)		Æthelgeard, his karus	Grant of 5 hides (mansae) at Niwantune.	Latin, Burton	Eadwig
600	953		A.D. 956 (ii)		Æthelhild, the noble lady	Grant of 20 hides (mansae) at Droxford, Hampshire	Latin with English bounds, Winchester, Old Minster	Eadwig
601	952		A.D. 956 (ii)		Æthelhild, the noble lady	Grant of 15.5 hides (mansae) at Ipplepen, Dainton and Abbotskerswell, Devon, and also 1 hide (hiwisc) at Bittleford in Widdecombe and 1 at Bromleage (? Brimley in Bovey Tracy), Devon.	Latin with English bounds, Sherborne (ex Horton)	Eadwig
602	954		A.D. 956 (iv)		Æthelnoth, minister	Grant of land at Darlaston, near Stone, Staffordshire	Latin with English bounds, Burton	Eadwig
603	977		A.D. 956 (ii)		Æthelnoth, his faithful minister	Grant of 13 hides (mansae) at Fyfield, Berkshire	Latin with English bounds, Abingdon	Eadwig
604	979		A.D. 956 (ii)		Æthelsige, his faithful minister	Grant of 5 hides (mansae) at East Stoke on Hayling Island, Hampshire	Latin with English bounds, Winchester, Old Minster	Eadwig
605	924		A.D. 955 or 956		Æthelwold, abbot, and his abbey at Abingdon	Grant of 20 hides (mansiunculae) at Abingdon.	Latin with English bounds, Abingdon	Eadwig
606	959		A.D. 956 (ii)		Æthelwold, his faithful minister	Grant of 15 hides (cassati) at Bleadon, Somerset.	Latin with English bounds, Winchester, Old Minster	Eadwig
607	919		A.D. 956 (ii; 13 Feb)		Æthelwold, abbot, and his monks	Grant of a wood at Hawkridge, Berkshire, for the building of a church at Abingdon.	Latin with English bounds, Abingdon	Eadwig
608	969		A.D. 906 for 956 (i)		Æthelwold, his fidelis	Grant of 4 hides (mansae) at Wudetune.	Latin with English bounds, Winchester, Old Minster	Eadwig
609	958		A.D. 956 (ii)		Alfred, his optimas	Grant of 5 hides (mansae) at Didlington in Chalbury and 1 at Uddens in Holt, Dorset.	Latin with English bounds, Wilton	Eadwig
610	927		A.D. 956 (iv)		St Peter's Abbey, Bath, and to Wulfgar, abbot	Grant of 30 hides (mansae) at Tidenham, Gloucestershire, of which 3 are to belong to the abbot.	Latin with English bounds, Bath	Eadwig
611	966		A.D. 956 (iv; Cheddar, Somerset, 29 Nov)		Beorhtnoth, his faithful princeps	Grant of 5 hides (mansae) at Tadmarton, Oxfordshire	Latin with English bounds, Abingdon	Eadwig
612	934		A.D. 956 (iv)		Beornric, his faithful minister	Grant of 6 hides (mansae) at (Little) Langford, Wiltshire	Latin with English bounds, Wilton	Eadwig
613	974		A.D. 956 (iv)		Beornric, his faithful minister	Grant of 5 hides (cassati) at Poolhampton, Hampshire	Latin with English bounds, Winchester, Old Minster	Eadwig
614	971		A.D. 956 (i)		Brihthelm, his faithful presbyter	Grant of land at Kennington, Berkshire	Latin with English bounds, Abingdon	Eadwig
615	986		A.D. 956 (ii)		Brihthelm, his kinsman, bishop-elect	Grant of 5 hides (mansae) at (Church) Stowe, Northamptonshire	Latin with English bounds, Abingdon	Eadwig
616	930		A.D. 956		Brihthelm, bishop, and the brethren of Chichester	Grant of 60 hides (mansae).	Latin, Selsey	Eadwig
617	964		A.D. 956 (iii)		Brihtnoth, his minister	Grant of 10 hides (cassati) at Tadmarton, Oxfordshire	Latin with English bounds, Abingdon	Eadwig
618	965		A.D. 956 (iii)		Brihtric, his minister	Grant of 5 hides (cassati) at Tadmarton, Oxfordshire	Latin with English bounds, Abingdon	Eadwig
619	982		A.D. 956 (iv)		Eadric, his faithful minister	Grant of 50 hides (mansae) at Meon, Hampshire	Latin with English bounds, Winchester, Old Minster	Eadwig
620	984		A.D. 956 (iv)		Eadric, his man	Grant of 5 hides (cassati) at Padworth, Berkshire	Latin with English bounds, Abingdon	Eadwig
621	955		A.D. 956 (ii)		Eadric, his carus	Grant of 16 hides (cassati) at Pyrford, Surrey.	Latin with English bounds, Abingdon	Eadwig
622	963		A.D. 956 (ii)		Eadric, his minister	Grant of 22 hides (mansae) at Welford, Berkshire	Latin with English bounds, Abingdon	Eadwig
623	978		A.D. 956 (iii)		Eadwig, his faithful minister	Grant of 8 hides (mansae) at Braunston, Northamptonshire	Latin with English bounds, Burton	Eadwig
624	961		A.D. 956 (ii)		Edmund, his optimas	Grant of 10 (altered to 16) hides (cassati) at Annington, Sussex.	Latin with English bounds, Abingdon	Eadwig
625	933		A.D. 956		Elswius, abbot of Glastonbury	Grant of 20 hides (mansae) at Nettleton, Wiltshire	Latin, Glastonbury	Eadwig
626	920		A.D. 956		St Mary's, Glastonbury	Confirmation of a vineyard with 2 hides (mansiunculae) at Panborough, Somerset.	Latin with English bounds, Glastonbury	Eadwig
627	973		A.D. 956 (i)		Hehelm, his fidelis	Grant of 5 hides (mansae) at Bathampton, Somerset, with a note that Hehelm promised the land to Bath Abbey after his death.	Latin with English bounds, Bath	Eadwig
628	951		A.D. 956		Mæglsothen, his man	Grant of 3 hides (mansae) at Mortune (? Morton, Derbyshire).	Latin, Burton	Eadwig
629	921		A.D. 956 (i)		Malmesbury Abbey	Grant of 100 hides (mansae) at Brokenborough, Wiltshire	Latin, Malmesbury	Eadwig
630	970		A.D. 956		the minster at Shaftesbury	Grant of 80 (or 90) hides (mansae), with the bounds of land at Donhead (St Andrew and ? St Mary) and Easton Bassett, Wiltshire; and at Compton Abbas, Sixpenny Handley and Iwerne Minster, Dorset.	Latin with English bounds, Shaftesbury	Eadwig
631	985		A.D. 956 (i)		Wigstan (Wistan), his fidelis	Grant of 4 hides (mansae) on the river Nadder (at Burcombe, Wiltshire).	Latin with English bounds, Wilton	Eadwig
632			A.D. 956		Wihtsige, his minister	Grant of 7 hides (mansae) at Corfe and Blashenwell, Dorset.	Latin with English bounds, Shaftesbury	Eadwig
633	937		A.D. 956 (Cirencester, Gloucs)		Worcester minster, at the instance of Brihtnoth	Grant of 5 hides (cassati) at Phepson in Himbleton, Worcestershire, with salt-furnaces.	Latin with English bounds, Worcester	Eadwig
634	925		A.D. 956 (iii)		Wulfric, his minister	Grant of 5 hides (mansae) in the common land at Charlton, Berkshire	Latin, Abingdon	Eadwig
635	962		A.D. 956 (ii)		Wulfric, one of his proceres	Grant of 5 hides (cassati) at Ebbesborne, Wiltshire	Latin with English bounds, Winchester, Old Minster	Eadwig
636	926		A.D. 956 (ii)		Wulfric, his princeps	Grant of 7 hides (cassati) at Millbrook, with a haga in Southampton, Hampshire	Latin with English bounds, Winchester, Old Minster	Eadwig
637	968		A.D. 956 (i)		Wulfric, the huntsman	Grant of 1.5 hides at Zeals and Donhead, Wiltshire	Latin, Christchurch (Twynham)	Eadwig
638	983		A.D. 956 (iii)		Wynsige, his faithful minister	Grant of 20 hides (cassati) at Moredon in Rodbourne Cheney, Wiltshire	Latin with English bounds, Winchester, Old Minster	Eadwig
639	1005		A.D. 957		Ælfheah, his very faithful dux	Grant of 10 hides (mansae) at Buckland, Berkshire	Latin with English bounds, Abingdon	Eadwig
640	1004		A.D. 957		Ælfric, his faithful minister	Grant of 5 hides (mansae) at Ebbesborne, Wiltshire	Latin with English bounds, Winchester, Old Minster	Eadwig
641	988		A.D. 957		Æthelgeard, his faithful minister	Grant of 15 hides (mansae) at Sotwell, Berkshire	Latin with English bounds, Winchester, New Minster	Eadwig
642	992		A.D. 957		Æthelred, his faithful minister	Grant of 10 hides (mansae) at Upton (Lovell), Wiltshire	Latin with English bounds, Wilton	Eadwig
643	1001		A.D. 957		St Peter's Abbey, Bath	Grant, at the request of his sacerdos Wulfgar, of 10 hides (mansae) at Bathford, Somerset.	Latin with English bounds, Bath	Eadwig
644	995		A.D. 957		Huna	Grant of 4 hides (mansae) at Lym.	Latin, Glastonbury	Eadwig
645	994		A.D. 957		Lyfing, his faithful minister	Grant of 9 hides (mansae) at Loceresleage (for Lotheresleage, lost, in Hendon) and at Tunworth (lost, in Kingsbury), Middlesex	Latin with English bounds, Westminster	Eadwig
646	999		A.D. 957 (Edington, Wilts, 9 May)		Oda, archbishop	Grant of 40 hides at Ely, Cambridgeshire	Latin, probably Ely	Eadwig
647	998		A.D. 957		Oswulf, bishop	Grant of 20 hides (mansae) at Stanton St Bernard, Wiltshire	Latin with English bounds, Wilton	Eadwig
648	1000		A.D. 957		New Minster, Winchester	Grant of 7 hides (cassati) at South Heighton, Sussex.	Latin with bounds in Old English, Middle English and Latin, Winchester, New Minster	Eadwig
649	1003		A.D. 957		Wulfstan, his faithful minister	Grant of 9 hides (mansae) at Conington, Huntingdonshire	Latin with English bounds, Winchester, Old Minster	Eadwig
650	1032		A.D. 958		Ædwold (Eadwold), his faithful minister	Grant of 10 hides (mansae) at Drayton, Berkshire	Latin with English bounds, Abingdon	Eadwig
651	1035		A.D. 958		Cenric, his faithful propincernarius	Grant of 2 hides (cassaturae) at Cern (? Pusey, Berkshire).	Latin with English bounds, Abingdon	Eadwig
652			A.D. 958 (for 959)		Ceolweard, minister	Grant of 1 hide (mansa) at Hamp, near Bridgewater, Somerset.	Latin with English bounds, Athelney	Eadwig
653	1027		A.D. 958		Eadheah, his faithful man	Grant of 2.5 hides (mansae) and 25 segetes at Ayshford in Burlescombe and Boehill in Sampford Peverell, Devon.	Latin with English bounds, Winchester, Old Minster	Eadwig
654	1028		A.D. 958		Eadric, his faithful minister	Grant of 30 hides (mansae) at Longworth, Berkshire	Latin with English bounds, Abingdon	Eadwig
655	1026		A.D. 958		Wulfgar Leofa, his karus	Grant of land at Shaftesbury, Dorset.	Latin with English bounds, Shaftesbury	Eadwig
656	1033		A.D. 958		Wulfgar, his faithful minister	Grant of 3 hides (mansae) at Thornton in Marnhull and Iwerne Courtney, Dorset, to be attached to the beneficiary's estate at Hinton St Mary (cf. S 502).	Latin with English bounds, Shaftesbury	Eadwig
657	1034		A.D. 958		Wulfric, his most faithful minister	Grant of 5 hides (cassati) at Denchworth, Berkshire	Latin with English bounds, Abingdon	Eadwig
658	1046		A.D. 959 (17 May)		Abingdon Abbey	Grant of privileges and confirmation of lands.	Latin, Abingdon	Eadwig
659	1029		A.D. 958 for 959		Oscytel, bishop	Grant of 20 hides (mansae) at Southwell, with dependencies at Normanton, Upton, Fiskerton, Farnsfield, Kirklington, Morton, Gibsmere, Bleasby, Goverton, Halloughton and Halam, Nottinghamshire	Latin with English bounds, York	Eadwig
660	1045		A.D. 959		New Minster, Winchester	Grant of 10 hides (mansae) at Bighton, Hampshire, with lease, for life, by the Minster to Ælfric, the king's minister, in return for 60 mancuses of gold.	Latin with bounds in Old English, Middle English and Latin, Winchester, New Minster	Eadwig
661	1009		A.D. 961 for 956 (iv)		the church of St Peter, Bath	Restitution of 5 hides (mansiunculae) at Weston, near Bath, Somerset.	Latin with English bounds, Bath	Eadwig
662	1031		A.D. 955 x 959		Ælfswith, matrona	Grant of 10 hides (cassati) at Kemsing, Kent.	Latin, Wilton	Eadwig
662a			A.D. 955 x 959		Æthelgeard, his faithful minister	Grant of 5 hides (mansae) at Bathingbourne in Godshill, Isle of Wight.	Latin with English bounds, Evesham	Eadwig
663	1002		(A.D. 956 (ii))		Æthelwold, abbot, and the monks at Abingdon	Grant of 20 hides (cassati) at Hinksey, Seacourt and Wytham, Berkshire	Latin with English bounds, Abingdon	Eadwig
664	936		A.D. 955 x 959		the church of St Peter, Bath	Restoration of 5 hides (mansae) at Olveston, and 5 at Cold Ashton, Gloucestershire, granted to the minster by King Athelstan (cf. S 414).	Latin with English bounds, Bath	Eadwig
665	996		A.D. 955 x 959		Eadric, his faithful minister	Grant of 10 hides (mansae) at Leckhampstead, and a mill on the river Lambourn, Berkshire	Latin, Abingdon	Eadwig
666	956		(A.D. 956 (i))		Wiferth, his faithful vassallus	Grant of 10 hides (mansae) at Knoyle, Wiltshire	Latin with English bounds, Wilton	Eadwig
667	1041		A.D. 958 (Penkridge, Staffs)	Edgar, king of Mercia	the familia of St Werburgh, Chester	Grant of 17 hides (manentes) at Hosely, Flint; Cheavely, Huntington, Upton, Aston (? Aston Sutton) and Barrow (? Great Barrow), Cheshire.	Latin, Chester	Edgar
668	1145		A.D. 922 for ? 972		Eadric, his faithful minister	Grant of 10 hides (mansae) at Winterburnan (Winterbourne Bassett, Wiltshire), of which 5 hides lie in the common land.	Latin with English bounds, Winchester, Old Minster	Edgar
669	1103		A.D. 951 for ? 961		Æthelnoth, his faithful man	Grant of 1 hide (mansa) at Clyst wicon (? Clyst St Mary, Devon).	Latin with English bounds, Exeter	Edgar
670	1048		A.D. 951 for ? 959 (Glastonbury)		the church of St Peter, Westminster	Restoration of 5 hides (mansiunculae) on the north side of the river Thames between the Tyburn and the Fleet, Middlesex, in return for 120 solidi of gold in an armlet.	Latin with English bounds, Westminster	Edgar
671	1295		A.D. 955 for ? 973		St Andrew, Rochester, and Ælfstan, bishop of Rochester	Grant of 10 hides (mansae) or sulungs at Bromley, Kent.	Latin with English bounds, Rochester	Edgar
672	1183		A.D. 956		Ælfstan, miles	Grant of [7 hides at] Harwell, Berkshire	Latin with English bounds, Winchester, Old Minster	Edgar
673	1047		A.D. 958 for 959		Abingdon Abbey	Confirmation of privileges and restoration of 10 hides (mansae) at Ginge, 15 at Goosey, 30 at Longworth and 5 at Bessels Leigh, Berkshire	Latin with English bounds, Abingdon	Edgar
674	1043		A.D. 958		Ælfheah, his minister	Grant of 5 hides (cassati) at Orton (Waterville), Huntingdonshire	Latin, Peterborough	Edgar
675	1042		A.D. 958	Edgar, king of Mercia	Æthelric, his minister	Grant of 20 hides (mansae) at Wootton, Oxfordshire	Latin with English bounds, Winchester, Old Minster	Edgar
676	1037		A.D. 958	Edgar, king of Mercia	Athelstan, his comes	Grant of 5 hides (mansiunculae) at Ham, Essex.	Latin with English bounds, Winchester, Old Minster	Edgar
676a			A.D. 958	Edgar, king of Mercia	Eadwald, his minister	Grant of 3 hides (mansiunculae) at Coundon, Warwickshire	Latin with English bounds, Coventry	Edgar
677	1040		A.D. 958	Edgar, king of Mercia	Ealhstan, his faithful minister	Grant of 6 hides (manentes) at Staunton on Arrow, Herefordshire, and a messuage (haga) in Hereford, in return for 40 mancuses of gold.	Latin with English bounds, Wells	Edgar
678	1036		A.D. 958	Edgar, king of Mercia	Eanulf, his minister	Grant of 14 hides (mansiunculae) at Ducklington, Oxfordshire, with the old church at Astlea and appurtenant land.	Latin with English bounds, Abingdon	Edgar
679	1044		A.D. 958		Oscytel, bishop	Grant of 10 hides (cassati) at Sutton, Nottinghamshire	Latin with English bounds, York	Edgar
680	1051		A.D. 959		Ælfwine, his faithful minister	Grant of 10 hides (cassati) at Highclere, Hampshire	Latin with English bounds, Winchester, Old Minster	Edgar
681	1052		A.D. 959		Quen, his faithful matrona	Grant of land at Howden and Old Drax, Yorkshire, with dependencies at Howden, Knedlington, Barnhill (Hall, west of Howden), Caville (in Eastrington), Thorpe Lidget, Hive, Eastrington, Belby (in Howden) and Kilpin, all Yorkshire	Latin with English bounds, Peterborough	Edgar
682	1058		A.D. 960		the church of St Mary, Abingdon	Grant of 20 hides (cassati) at Drayton, Berkshire	Latin with English bounds, Abingdon	Edgar
683	1054		A.D. 960		his kinsman Brithhelm, bishop	Grant of 10 hides (cassati) at Bishopstoke, Hants, for his lifetime, with reversion to Old Minster, Winchester.	Latin with English bounds, Winchester, Old Minster	Edgar
684	1056		A.D. 960		Eanulf, his faithful minister	Grant of 9 hides (cassati) at Tywarnhayle in Perranzabuloe and St Agnes, and 2 (mansae) at Bosowsa in Ladock, Cornwall.	Latin with English bounds, Exeter	Edgar
685	1053		A.D. 960		Oswulf, bishop	Grant of 20 hides (mansae) at Stanton St Bernard, Wiltshire	Latin with English bounds, Wilton	Edgar
686	1057		A.D. 960		the Abbey of Saint-Denis, Paris	Restoration of property at Rotherfield, Hastings and Pevensey, Sussex.	Latin, Paris, Saint-Denis	Edgar
687	1055		A.D. 960		Wulfric, minister	Restitution of forfeited lands at Æscesburuh (Woolstone), Denchworth, Garford, Chieveley, Stanmore in Beedon, Chaddleworth, Boxford, Benham, Berkshire; Worting, Tichborne, Hampshire; Stedham, Tillington, Patching, Poynings and Newtimber, Sussex.	Latin, Abingdon	Edgar
688	1067		A.D. 961		Abingdon Abbey	Grant of 20 hides (cassati) at Burbage, Wiltshire	Latin with English bounds, Abingdon	Edgar
689	1080		A.D. 961		Abingdon Abbey	Grant of 50 hides (cassati) at Hurstbourne Tarrant, Hampshire, and 13 predia in Winchester, with the bounds of Crux Easton, Hampshire	Latin with English bounds, Abingdon	Edgar
690	1066		A.D. 961		Abingdon Abbey	Grant of 22 hides (cassati) at Ringwood, Hampshire	Latin with English bounds, Abingdon	Edgar
691	1079		A.D. 961		Ælfric, his faithful minister	Grant of 9 hides (mansae) in the common land at Ardington, Berkshire	Latin with English bounds, Abingdon	Edgar
692	1074		A.D. 961		Æthelwold, his faithful minister	Grant of one hide (cassa for cassatus) at Evesty (lost) on the river Camelar (Cam Brook), Somerset.	Latin with English bounds, Bath	Edgar
693	1077		A.D. 961		Æthelwulf, his faithful minister	Grant, for three lives, of 10 hides (mansae) at Kilmeston, woodland at Milbarrow Down, near Bishops Waltham, Hampshire, and a messuage (haga) at Winchester, with an annual rent and eventual reversion to St Peter's (Old Minster, Winchester).	Latin with English bounds, Winchester, Old Minster	Edgar
694	1073		A.D. 961		the church of St Peter, Bath	Restoration of 5 hides (mansiunculae) at South Stoke, Somerset.	Latin with English bounds, Bath	Edgar
695	1076		A.D. 961		Brihthelm, bishop	Grant of 7.5 hides at Easton near Winchester, Hampshire	Latin with English bounds, Winchester, Old Minster	Edgar
696	1071		A.D. 961		Byrnsige, minister	Grant of 5 hides (cassati) at Ebbesborne, Wiltshire	Latin with English bounds, Winchester, Old Minster	Edgar
697	1072		A.D. 961		Cenwulf, his faithful man	Grant of 4 hides (mansae) at Withiel Florey, Somerset.	Latin with English bounds, Winchester, Old Minster	Edgar
698	1075		A.D. 961		Eadric, his faithful minister	Grant of 3 hides (cassati) at Hamstede.	Latin with English bounds, Abingdon	Edgar
699	1068		A.D. 961		the Old Minster, Winchester	Grant of 5 hides (mansae) at Avington, Hampshire	Latin with English bounds, Winchester, Old Minster	Edgar
700	1095		A.D. 962		Abingdon Abbey	Grant of 3 hides (cassati) in the common land at Hendred, Berkshire	Latin with English, Abingdon	Edgar
701	1094		A.D. 962		Abingdon Abbey	Grant of a vineyard at Watchet, Somerset, and miscellaneous rights including royal dues at Southampton, at Hwitan Clife, and at Portmanna hythe.	Latin, Abingdon	Edgar
702	1085		A.D. 962		Ælfheah, his kinsman	Grant of 10 hides (cassati) at Sunbury, Middlesex	Latin with English bounds, Westminster	Edgar
703	1082		A.D. 962		Æthelflæd, matrona	Grant of 7 hides (mansae) at Chelsworth, Suffolk.	Latin with English bounds, Bury St Edmunds	Edgar
704			A.D. 962		Æthel...e, his minister	Grant of 3 perticae at Sorley in Churchstow, Devon.	Latin with English bounds, Buckfast	Edgar
705	1093		A.D. 962		Eadwine, his faithful minister	Grant of 20 hides (mansae) at Moredon in Rodbourne Cheney, Wiltshire	Latin with English bounds, Abingdon	Edgar
706	1083		A.D. 962		Titstan, his faithful cubicularius	Grant of 8 hides (cassati) at Afene (Avon Farm in Stratford-sub-Castle, Wiltshire).	Latin with English bounds, uncertain (possibly Wilton)	Edgar
707	1081		A.D. 962		Wulfmær, his faithful minster	Grant of 10 hides (mansae) at Hilmarton and Littlecott, Wiltshire	Latin, Burton	Edgar
708	1124		A.D. 963		Abingdon Abbey	Grant of 4 hides (cassati) at Easthall (cf. East Hale Bottom, near Eastbourne), Sussex.	Latin with English bounds, Abingdon	Edgar
709	1116		A.D. 963		Ælfric, his faithful minister	Grant of 1 hide (mansa), less a half pertica, at Manworthy in Milverton, Somerset.	Latin with English bounds, Wells	Edgar
710	1115		A.D. 963		Ælfsige, his faithful minister	Grant of 5 hides (cassati) at East Orchard, Dorset.	Latin with English bounds, Shaftesbury	Edgar
711	1099		A.D. 963		Ælfsige, his faithful decurio	Grant of 2.5 hides at Stanton Prior, Somerset.	Latin with English bounds, Bath	Edgar
712	1112		A.D. 963		Æsclac	Grant of 20 hides (cassati) at Sherburn-in-Elmet, Yorkshire, with dependencies at Hibaldes tofte, (Monk) Fryston, Hillam, Lumby, (South) Milford, Steeton, Micklefield, Lotherton, Church Fenton, and Cawood, all in Yorkshire	Latin with English bounds, York	Edgar
712a			A.D. 963		Æthelferth	Grant of 5 hides (mansi) at Ballidon, Derbyshire	Latin with English bounds, uncertain	Edgar
713	1121		A.D. 963		Æthelsige, his camerarius	Grant of 10 hides (mansae) at 'Sparsholt' (i.e. Fawler), one hide at Balking and a mill at Hirdegrafe (probably in Steventon), Berkshire	Latin with English bounds, Abingdon	Edgar
714	1125		A.D. 963		Æthelwold, bishop	Grant of 24 hides (cassati) at Washington, Sussex.	Latin with English bounds, Abingdon	Edgar
715	1118		A.D. 963		himself	Grant of 5 hides (mansae) at Patney, Wiltshire	Latin with English bounds, Winchester, Old Minster	Edgar
716	1113		A.D. 963		Gunner, his faithful dux	Grant of 30 hides (cassati) at Newbald, Yorkshire	Latin with English bounds, York	Edgar
717	1101		A.D. 963		Ingeram, his faithful minister	Grant of 7 hides (cassati) at Vange, Essex.	Latin with English bounds, Canterbury, Christ Church	Edgar
718	1114		A.D. 963		the church of St Andrew, Meon	Grant of 8 hides (cassati) at Ambersham, Sussex.	Latin with English bounds, Winchester, Old Minster	Edgar
719	1120		A.D. 963		Wynstan, his faithful camerarius	Grant of 3 hides (cassati) in the common land at Afene (? Avon Farm in Stratford-sub-Castle, Wiltshire).	Latin, Wilton	Edgar
720	1100		A.D. 963		Wulfgeat, his faithful minister	Grant of 3 hides (cassati) at Duddestone (? Duddeston near Birmingham, Warwickshire) and 3 at Ernlege (? Upper Arley, Worcestershire).	Latin, Burton	Edgar
721	1104		A.D. 963		Wulfhelm, his minister	Grant of 2 hides (cassati) at Otheri (apparently Ottery St Mary, Devon).	Latin with English bounds, Glastonbury	Edgar
722	1123		A.D. 963		Wulfnoth, his faithful minister	Grant of 5 hides (cassati) at Hocan edisce.	Latin with English bounds, Abingdon	Edgar
723	1119		A.D. 963		Wulfric, his minister	Grant of 6 hides (mansae) at Plesc (? Plaish in Cardington) and at Church Aston, Shropshire.	Latin with English bounds, Winchester, Old Minster	Edgar
724	1142		A.D. 964		St Mary's, Abingdon	Grant of 10 hides (mansae) at Hendred, Berkshire	Latin with English bounds, Abingdon	Edgar
725	1143		A.D. 964		Ælfthryth, his queen	Grant of 10 hides (mansae) at Aston Upthorpe, Berkshire	Latin with English bounds, Abingdon	Edgar
726	1134		A.D. 964		Beorhtnoth, his comes	Grant of 2 hides (mansiunculae) at Cookley in Wolverley, Worcestershire	Latin with English bounds, Worcester	Edgar
727	1127		A.D. 964		himself	Grant of land at Steeple Ashton, Wiltshire With addition of bounds of Mideltune.	Latin with English bounds, Romsey	Edgar
728			A.D. 964		St Peter's, Ghent	Grant of land in Lewisham, Greenwich, Woolwich, Mottingham and Coombe, Kent.	Latin, Ghent, St Peter's	Edgar
729			A.D. 964		Muchelney Abbey	Confirmation of liberties, including the right of the community to elect its own abbot after the death of Bishop Ælfwold (of Sherborne).	Latin, Muchelney	Edgar
730	1138		A.D. 964		Sigestan, his faithful minister	Grant of 5 hides (cassati) in the common land at Teffont, Wiltshire	Latin, Shaftesbury	Edgar
731	1135		A.D. 964 = 963 (Gloucester, 28 December)		St Mary's Abbey, Worcester	Grant of privileges for land at Cropthorne, Overbury, Pendock, Worcestershire; Teddington, Gloucestershire; Mitton in Bredon, Sedgeberrow, Worcestershire; Northwick in Blockley, Evenlode, Daylesford, Dorn in Batsford, Icomb, Gloucestershire; Shipston-on-Stour, Blackwell in Tredington, Warwickshire; Grimley, Little Witley, Knightwick, Hallow, Harvington, Bredon, Worcestershire; Blockley, Gloucestershire; Tredington, Warwicks; together with the creation of the triple Hundred of Oswaldslow.	Latin with English, Worcester	Edgar
732	1171		A.D. 965		Abingdon Abbey	Grant of 5 hides (cassati) at Beedon, Berkshire	Latin, Abingdon	Edgar
733	1172		A.D. 965		Abingdon Abbey	Grant of 2 hides (cassati) at Denchworth, Berkshire	Latin, Abingdon	Edgar
734	1169		A.D. 965		Abingdon Abbey	Grant of 50 hides (cassati) at Marcham, Berkshire	Latin with English bounds, Abingdon	Edgar
735	1164		A.D. 965		Æscwig, abbot of St Peter's, Bath	Grant of 7.5 hides (mansiunculae) at Stanton Prior, Somerset.	Latin with English bounds, Bath	Edgar
736	1165		A.D. 965		Wulfheard, his faithful man	Grant of 3 virgae at Cheselbourne, Dorset.	Latin with English bounds, Abbotsbury	Edgar
737	1189		A.D. 966		Ælfgifu, his kinswoman	Grant of 10 hides (cassatae) at Linslade, Buckinghamshire	Latin with English bounds, Abingdon	Edgar
738	1176		A.D. 966		Ælfgifu, his kinswoman	Grant of 10 hides (cassatae) at Newnham Murren, Oxfordshire	Latin with English bounds, Winchester, Old Minster	Edgar
739	1175		A.D. 966		Ælfhelm, his minister	Grant of 10 hides (mansae) at Parwich, Derbyshire	Latin, Burton	Edgar
740			A.D. 966		Ælfwold, bishop	Grant of 10 hides (cassati) at Isle Abbotts, Somerset.	Latin with English bounds, Muchelney	Edgar
741	1178		A.D. 966		Crowland Abbey	Grant of privileges and confirmation of land etcirca at Crowland, Spalding, Pinchbeck, Whaplode, Algarkirk, Dowdike, Drayton, Burtoft, Sutterton, Bucknall, Hallington, Gerimthorp, Langtoft, Baston, Deeping, Thetford, Rippingale, Laithorp, Kirkby, Lincolnshire; Wellingborough, Addington, Elmington, Glapthorn, Worthorpe, Peakirk and Badby, Northamptonshire; Morborne and Thurning, Huntingdonshire; Beeby, Sutton, Stapleton, Leicestershire; Cottenham, Oakington and Dry Drayton, Cambridgeshire; and at Standon, Hertfordshire	Latin with bounds, Crowland	Edgar
742	1177		A.D. 966		Ethelred (Ælfthryth) his wife	Grant of 15 hides (mansae) at Buckland (Newton), Dorset.	Latin, Glastonbury	Edgar
743	1188		A.D. 966		Glastonbury Abbey	Grant of 2 hides (mansiunculae) at (Podimore) Milton, Somerset.	Latin with English bounds, Glastonbury	Edgar
744	1186		A.D. 966		Shaftesbury Abbey	Confirmation of 10 hides (cassati) at Uppidelen (Piddletrenthide, Dorset), originally granted by the king's grandmother, Wynflæd.	Latin with English bounds, Shaftesbury	Edgar
745	1190		A.D. 966		New Minster, Winchester	Refoundation and grant of privileges.	Latin, Winchester, New Minster	Edgar
746	1191		A.D. 966		New Minster, Winchester	Grant of 5 hides at Donnington, 28 at Southease, 10 at Telscombe, Sussex, and 2 at Winterburna (Addeston in Maddington, Wiltshire).	Latin, Winchester, New Minster	Edgar
747	1196		A.D. 967		Ælfheah, his faithful comes, and Ælfswith, Ælfheah's, wife	Grant of 5 hides (cassati) at Merton and Dulwich, Surrey. Bounds of Merton.	Latin with English bounds, Glastonbury	Edgar
748	1199		A.D. 967		Ælfsige, his minister	Grant of 5 hides (cassati) at Eastune.	Latin with English bounds, Winchester, Old Minster	Edgar
749	1283		A.D. 967 for 972		Æthelwold, bishop, for the church of Breedon-on-the-Hill, Leics.	Grant of 13 hides (cassati) at Breedon, Wilson, Ætheres dune (? Atterton) and Diseworth, Leicestershire	Latin, Burton	Edgar
750	1209		A.D. 967		Beorhtnoth, his comes	Grant of land at Bragenfelda (? Cold Brayfield, Buckinghamshire, or Brafield-on-the-Green, Northamptonshire).	Latin, Abingdon	Edgar
751	1201		A.D. 967		Brihtnoth, his faithful minister	Grant of 2 hides (mansae) at Suthtune (Ullington in Pebworth, Gloucestershire), and at Bickmarsh, Worcestershire, with regrant of the land by Brithnoth to St Mary's, Worcester, on his son's admission to the minster.	Latin with English bounds, Worcester	Edgar
752	1195		A.D. 967		Chertsey Abbey	Confirmation of privileges and of land, consisting of 5 hides (mansae) at Chertsey and 10 hides (cassati) at Thorpe, 20 at Egham with Englefield, 5 at Chobham with Busseleghe, Frensham and Frimley, 10 (mansiones) at Petersham, 30 at Sutton with swine-pastures at Thunderfield Castle, 20 at Cheam with swine-pastures in the Weald [and the charter which Edgar had bought from Eadwine for 50 mancuses], 10 at Waddington, 20 at Coulsdon, 20 at Merstham, 10 at Chipstead with Chaldon, 10 at Banstead with Suthemeresfelda (cf. Canon's Farm in Banstead), 20 at Epsom, 12 at Bookham, 10 at (East) Clandon, 20 at Cobham with Pointers (in Cobham), 5 at Byfleet with Weybridge, all in Surrey; 10 at (White) Waltham, Berkshire; and 20 at Molesey, Surrey [which King Eadwig unjustly gave to Old Minster, Winchester, and which were retrieved by Edgar and Bishop Æthelwold].	Latin, Chertsey	Edgar
753	1198		A.D. 967		Dunstan, archbishop	Grant of 1.5 hides at Cealuadune (Chaldon, Surrey). Half the land had been forfeited by Eadwold for theft.	Latin with English bounds, Westminster	Edgar
754	1200		A.D. 967		Wynflæd, the noble matrona	Grant of 8 hides (mansae) at (East and West) Meon, and Farnfield in Privett, Hampshire	Latin with English bounds, Winchester, Old Minster	Edgar
755	1197		A.D. 967		Wulfnoth Rumuncant, his faithful vassalus	Grant of 3 hides (mansae) at Lesneage and Pennare in St Keverne, Cornwall.	Latin with English bounds, Exeter	Edgar
756	1213		A.D. 958 or 968		Abingdon Abbey	Grant of 72 hides (cassati) at Bedwyn, Wiltshire	Latin with English bounds, Abingdon	Edgar
757	1222		A.D. 968		Abingdon Abbey	Grant of 30 hides (cassati) at Cumnor, Berkshire	Latin with English bounds, Abingdon	Edgar
758	1221		A.D. 968		Abingdon Abbey	Grant of 25 hides (cassati) at Fyfield, Berkshire	Latin with English bounds, Abingdon	Edgar
759	1224		A.D. 968		Abingdon Abbey	Grant of 10 or 20 hides (cassati) at Hanney, Berkshire	Latin with English bounds, Abingdon	Edgar
760	1225		A.D. 968		Abingdon Abbey	Grant of 10 hides (cassati) at Oare, Berkshire	Latin with English bounds, Abingdon	Edgar
761	1227		A.D. 968		Ælfwine, his faithful minister	Grant of 10 hides (mansae) at Boxford, Berkshire	Latin with English bounds, Abingdon	Edgar
762	1218		A.D. 968		Brihtgifu, his faithful lady	Grant of 3 iugera at Ealderescumbe.	Latin with English bounds, Shaftesbury	Edgar
763	1217		A.D. 968		Eadwine, his faithful minister	Grant of 20 hides (cassati) at Moredon in Rodbourne Cheney, Wiltshire	Latin with English bounds, Winchester, Old Minster	Edgar
764	1214		A.D. 968		Glastonbury Abbey	Grant of 30 hides (cassati) at Sturminster Newton, Dorset.	Latin with English bounds, Glastonbury	Edgar
765	1215		A.D. 968		Romsey Abbey	Grant of land at Edington, Wiltshire	Latin with English bounds, Romsey	Edgar
766			A.D. 968		Wilton Abbey	Confirmation of land given to the church by Wulfthryth, consisting of 10 hides at South Newton, 10 at Sherrington, 20 at (? Kingston) Deverill, 3 at Baverstock and 3 at Frustfield (lost), Wiltshire; and 10 at Watchingwell in Calbourne, Isle of Wight.	Latin with English bounds, Wilton	Edgar
767	1216		A.D. 968		Wilton Abbey	Grant of 2 hides (cassati) near Wilton, Wiltshire, formerly owned by Regenweard, mercator.	Latin with English bounds, Wilton	Edgar
768	1211		A.D. 968		Wulfric, bishop (? of Hereford)	Grant of 1 hide (mansa) at Stantun (? Stanton by Newhall, Derbyshire).	Latin with English bounds, Burton	Edgar
769	1226		A.D. 968		Wulfstan, his faithful minister	Grant of 10 hides (mansae) at Whistley, Berkshire	Latin, Abingdon	Edgar
770	1231		A.D. 969		Ælfheah Gerent, his man, and Ælfheah's wife, Morwrei	Grant of 2 hides (mansae) and one pertica at Lamorran and Trenowth in Probus, Cornwall. Including bounds of 1 yardlard at Tregellas, Cornwall.	Latin with English bounds, Exeter	Edgar
771	1230		A.D. 969		Ælfhelm, his faithful minister	Grant of 30 hides (cassati) at Witney, Oxfordshire, with appurtenant meadow.	Latin with English bounds, Winchester, Old Minster	Edgar
772	1229		A.D. 969		Ælfwold, his faithful minister	Grant of 15 hides (cassati) at Aspley Guise, Bedfordshire	Latin with English bounds, Worcester	Edgar
773	1234		A.D. 969		Ælfwold, his faithful minister	Grant of 10 hides (cassati) at Kineton, Warwickshire	Latin with English bounds, Worcester	Edgar
774	1228		A.D. 969 (15 May)		St Peter's, Thorney (i.e. Westminster Abbey)	Confirmation, reciting a bull of Pope John, of liberties and of land at Ham (in East Ham), Wennington, Essex; Morden, Surrey; Fanton (Hall) in North Benfleet, Essex; Aldenham, Hertfordshire; Bleccenham and Lothereslege (both lost, in Hendon), Middlesex; Holwell, Datchworth and Watton-at-Stone, Hertfordshire; Chollington in Eastbourne, Sussex; Staines, with Teddington, Halliford, Feltham and Ashford, Middlesex	Latin, Westminster	Edgar
775	1259		A.D. 970		Ælfswith, widow and nun	Grant of 10 hides (cassati) at Idmiston, Wiltshire	Latin, Glastonbury	Edgar
776	1265		A.D. 970 (Woolmer, Hants, Easter)		Æthelwold, bishop of Winchester	Grant of the minster of Ely and of land at Melbourn and Armingford, Cambridgeshire, in exchange for land at Harting, Sussex.	Latin, Ely	Edgar
777	1257		A.D. 970		the church of St Peter, Bath	Grant of 10 hides (cassati) at Clifton, near Bath, in exchange for 100 mancuses of gold and 10 hides (mansae) at Cumtun (Chilcompton or Compton Dando, Somerset). The land is to be for the use of the monks, just as Abbot Æscwig obtained it.	Latin with English bounds, Bath	Edgar
778	1260		A.D. 970		Brihtheah, his faithful deacon	Grant of 7 hides (mansae) at Kingston Bagpuize, Berkshire	Latin, Abingdon	Edgar
779	1266		A.D. 970 (Woolmer, Hants)		Ely Abbey	Confirmation of privileges and of land at Melbourn and Armingford, Cambridgeshire, and at Northwold, Norfolk, in exchange for 60 hides (cassati) at Harting, Sussex.	Latin and English versions, Ely	Edgar
780	1268		A.D. 970		Ely Abbey	Grant of 10 hides (cassati) in the common land at Linden End in Aldreth, Cambridgeshire	Latin with English and English bounds, Ely	Edgar
781	1269		A.D. 970		Ely Abbey	Grant of 10 hides (cassati) at Stoke near Ipswich, Suffolk.	Latin with English bounds, Ely	Edgar
782	1270		A.D. 971		Æthelwold, bishop	Grant of land at Barrow-upon-Humber, Lincolnshire, for Peterborough Abbey, in return for 40 pounds of silver and a golden cross.	Latin with English bounds, Peterborough	Edgar
783	1277		A.D. 971		Glastonbury Abbey	Grant of privileges.	Latin with English, Glastonbury	Edgar
784	1283		A.D. 972		Ælfflæd	Grant of 10 hides (mansae) at Kennett (i.e. Overton), Wiltshire	Latin with English bounds, Wilton	Edgar
785	1287		A.D. 972		Bath Abbey	Grant of 10 hides (mansiunculae) at Corston, Somerset.	Latin with English bounds, Bath	Edgar
786	1282		A.D. 972		Pershore Abbey	Grant of privileges and restoration of land at Pershore, and of 10 hides (mansi) at Bricklehampton, 10 at Comberton, 5 at Pensham in Pershore St Andrew, 16 at Eckington, 10 at Birlingham, 10 at Defford, 10 at Strensham, 10 at Besford, land at Cromban (? Croombe Perry in Pirton), 10 hides at Severn Stoke, 10 hides at Pirton, 4 at Wadborough in Pershore Holy Cross, 3 at Chevington ibid., 3 at Broughton ibid., 10 at Peopleton, 10 at Snodsbury, 7 at Naunton Beauchamp, 4 at Abberton, 5 at Wihtlafestune (? North Piddle), 5 at Flyford, 5 at Grafton Flyford, 5 at Dormston, 5 at Martin Hussingtree, 3 at Broughton Hackett, 2 at Libbery in Grafton Flyford, 30 at Longdon, 7 at Powick, 3 at Beornothesleahe (Leigh), all in Worcestershire; 3 at Acton Beauchamp, Herefordshire; 40 at South Stoke (i.e. Hawkesbury), Hillesley, Tresham, Kilcott, Oldbury on the Hill, Didmarton, Badminton and Hawkesbury Upton, 10 at Dyrham, 5 at Longney, 6 at Lydney, 6 at Wyegate, all in Gloucestershire; 5 at Beoley, 5 at Yardley, Worcestershire; 10 at Sture (Alderminster, Warwickshire); 20 at Broadway, Worcestershire; 5 at Coltune; 10 at Childs Wickham, Gloucestershire; sites for vats at Middlewich and Netherwich in Droitwich, furnaces at Witton in Droitwich and 1.5 hides at Horton in Hampton Lovett, Worcestershire, and 3 iugera with meadow at Worcester.	Latin with English bounds, Worcester (ex Pershore)	Edgar
787	1258		A.D. 972		Peterborough Abbey, with later confirmations, grant of privileges for the abbey and its land at Dogsthorpe, Eye, Paston and Oundle, Northants.	And confirmation of land at Barrow-upon-Humber, Lincolnshire; Warmington, Ashton, Kettering, Castor, Ailsworth, Walton, Werrington, Eye, and Thorp, Northamptonshire; a mint at Stamford, Lincolnshire; and half of Whittlesey Mere.	Latin, Peterborough	Edgar
788	1284		A.D. 972		Worcester Abbey	Grant of privileges and confirmation of land at Worcester, vats at Middlewich and Netherwich in Droitwich, furnaces at Witton in Droitwich, and land at Nortun (for Hortun) and at Westwood near Droitwich, all in Worcestershire	Latin, Worcester	Edgar
789	1286		A.D. 972		Wynstan, his cubicularius	Grant of 4 hides (cassati) at Afene (? Little Durnford, cf. Avon Farm in Stratford-sub-Castle, Wiltshire).	Latin with English bounds, Wilton	Edgar
790	1292		A.D. 973		Ælfric, his minister	Grant of 7 hides (mansiunculae) at Harwell, Berkshire	Latin with English bounds, Winchester, Old Minster	Edgar
791	1294		A.D. 973		Glastonbury Abbey	Grant of 7 hides (mansiunculae) at High Ham, Somerset, in exchange for land at Braunton, Devon.	Latin with English bounds, Glastonbury	Edgar
792	1297		A.D. 973		Thorney Abbey	Grant of privileges and confirmation of land at Whittlesey, Cambridgeshire; Water Newton, Woodston, Yaxley and Farcet, Huntingdonshire; Barrow-upon-Humber, Lincolnshire; Teafolscet; and 2 hides (mansae) at Huntingdon. MS 3 adds Wittering, Oxney, Thorpe and Titchmarsh, Northants; Gedney, Lutton, Angarhala (lost) and Tydd, Lincolnshire; and Broughton, Huntingdonshire	Latin, Thorney	Edgar
793	1291		A.D. 973		Wulfmær, his minister	Grant of 5 hides (mansiunculae) at Burgh' (? Berrow, Somerset).	Latin with English bounds, Glastonbury	Edgar
794	1305		A.D. 974		Ælfhelm, his minister	Grant of 2.5 hides (mansae) at (West) Wratting, Cambridgeshire	Latin with English bounds, Ely	Edgar
794a			A.D. 974		Ælfhelm, his minister	Grant of 9 hides (mansiunculae) at Brickendon, Hertfordshire, consisting of 6 at Ælesforda and 3 at Elrices rig.	Latin with English bounds, Westminster	Edgar
795	1303		A.D. 974		Ælfhere, his faithful minister	Grant of 3 hides (mansae) at Nymed (Woolfin in Down St Mary, Devon).	Latin with English bounds, Exeter (ex Crediton)	Edgar
796	1301		A.D. 974		Ælfric, abbot of Malmesbury	Restoration of 10 hides (manentes) at Eastcourt in Crudwell, Wiltshire The land had been forfeited by Ætheloth.	Latin, Malmesbury	Edgar
797	1300		A.D. 974		Ælfric, abbot of Malmesbury	Restoration of land at Nene which had been forfeited by Æthelnoth.	Latin, Crowland	Edgar
798	1310		A.D. 974 (28 Decirca)		Ramsey Abbey	Confirmation and grant of privileges and of land at Ramsey, Upwood with Raveley, Hemingford, Sawtry, Stukeley, Brington and Old Weston, Huntingdonshire; Hilgay and Walsoken, Norfolk; fish from Wells, Norfolk; land at Brancaster, Norfolk; at Warboys, Wistow with Raveley and Bury, and at Slepam (St Ives), Huntingdonshire; at Chatteris and Elsworth, Cambridgeshire; at Whiston and Isham, Northamptonshire; at Houghton, Wyton, Ripton, Ellington, Bythorn, Huntingdonshire; at Graveley, Cambridgeshire; and at Dillington, Great Staughton and Yelling, Huntingdonshire	Latin, Ramsey	Edgar
799	1304		A.D. 974 (Bath, Pentecost)		Wulfthryth, abbess, and Wilton Abbey	Confirmation of privileges and land including land at Chalke, Wiltshire	Latin, Wilton	Edgar
800	1316		A.D. 975		Ælfweard, his minister (bishop in rubric)	Grant of 5 hides (cassati) at Fyfield, Hampshire	Latin with English bounds, Winchester, Old Minster	Edgar
801	1312		A.D. 975 (? for 974)		Æthelwold, bishop	Grant of 3 hides (mansae) at Madeley, Staffordshire	Latin with English bounds, Winchester, Old Minster	Edgar
802	1315		A.D. 975 (Glastonbury)		Ealhhelm, his minister, at the request of the monk Ælfwine, the king's kinsman	Grant of 3 hides (mansiunculae) at Aston in Wellington, Shropshire.	Latin with English bounds, Winchester, Old Minster	Edgar
803	1314		A.D. 975		Osward, his propinquus	Grant of 4 hides (mansiunculae) at South Stoke, Sussex. The old landbook had been lost in a fire.	Latin with English bounds, Winchester, Old Minster	Edgar
804	1313		A.D. 975		Old Minster, Winchester	Grant of land at Bleadon, Somerset.	Latin with bounds, Winchester, Old Minster	Edgar
805	1309		A.D. 978 for circa 972		Mangoda, his faithful minister	Grant of 5 hides (cassati) at Hampstead, Middlesex	Latin with English bounds, Westminster	Edgar
806	1219		A.D. 978 for ? 968 (Cheddar, Easter)		Winchester Cathedral	Renewal of the liberty of Taunton, Somerset, as granted by King Edward in exchange for land at 10 hides at Crowcombe, 20 at Compton and 20 at Banwell, Somerset, and 20 at Stoce near Shalbourne, Wiltshire, the land at Compton and Banwell having been given later to the community at Cheddar in exchange for land at Carhampton, Somerset. In return for the confirmation Bishop Æthelwold gave to King Edgar 200 mancuses of gold and a gold cup weighing 5 pounds and to Queen Ælfthryth 50 mancuses.	Latin and English versions, Winchester, Old Minster	Edgar
807	1302		A.D. 984 for 963 x 970		Old Minster, New Minster and Nunnaminster, Winchester	Grant of land in Winchester.	Latin, Winchester, Old Minster	Edgar
808	1185		A.D. 963 x 971		the church of Canterbury	Grant of Sandwich, Kent.	Latin, Canterbury, Christ Church	Edgar
809	1173		A.D. 961 x 971 (? 963)		St Augustine's Abbey, Canterbury	Grant of 4 sulungs (aratra) at Plumstead, Kent.	Latin, Canterbury, St Augustine's	Edgar
810			A.D. 961 x 963		the minster [of Plympton, Devon]	Grant of 2 hides (mansae) at Lanow in St Kew, Cornwall, with reversion to the minster of SS Dawe and Kew.	Latin with bounds, St Kew	Edgar
811	1319		A.D. 959 x 963		Eadgifu, his grandmother	Renewal of a charter concerning 65 hides (mansae) at Meon, Hampshire, the old landbook having disappeared while in Edgar's custody.	Latin with English bounds, Winchester, Old Minster	Edgar
812	1187		A.D. 967 x 975		Romsey Abbey	Confirmation of privileges, including free election of a new abbess. With bounds of Romsey, Hampshire	Latin with English bounds, Romsey	Edgar
813	1308		? A.D. 970 x 975		St Mary's, Sherborne	Grant of 5 hides at Oborne, Dorset.	English, Sherborne	Edgar
814	1150		A.D. 963 x 975		the church of Winchester	Restoration of 40 hides (cassati) at Alresford, Hampshire	Latin, Winchester, Old Minster	Edgar
815	1155		A.D. 963 x 975		Winchester Cathedral	Confirmation of 70 hides (mansae) at Beddington, Surrey, with woodland at Cysledun (? Chessington), Tandridge and Lace (in Horley), Surrey.	Latin, Winchester, Old Minster	Edgar
816	1157		A.D. 963 x 975		Winchester Cathedral	Confirmation of 38 hides (cassati) at Bishops Waltham, Hampshire, acquired in exchange for land at Portchester.	Latin, Winchester, Old Minster	Edgar
817	1147		A.D. 963 x 975		Old Minster, Winchester	Renewal of the privileges of Chilcomb, Hampshire	Latin and English versions, Winchester, Old Minster	Edgar
818	1159		A.D. 963 x 975		the bishopric of Winchester	Confirmation of land at Chilcomb, Hampshire, and restoration of land at Downton, Wiltshire; Taunton, Somerset; Alresford, Clere, Tichborne, Worthy, Hampshire; Fonthill, Wiltshire; Bishopstoke, Hampshire; and at Fermesham (probably Farnham, Surrey).	Latin, Winchester, Old Minster	Edgar
819	1151		A.D. 963 x 975		the church of Winchester	Restoration of 10 hides (mansae) at Clearan, Hampshire, previously granted by King Æthelwulf as part of his 'decimation'.	Latin, Winchester, Old Minster	Edgar
820	1307		A.D. 973 x 974		Old Minster, Winchester	Grant of 45 hides (cassati) at Crondall, Hampshire	Latin with English bounds, Winchester, Old Minster	Edgar
821	1146		A.D. 963 x 975		the church of Winchester	Restoration of 100 hides (mansae) at Downton, Wiltshire, and 30 hides at Etdrethecumbe, Isle of Wight, and renewal of the liberty of Chilcomb, Hampshire	Latin, Winchester, Old Minster	Edgar
822	1156		A.D. 963 x 975		Winchester Cathedral	Confirmation of 30 hides (mansae) at Fareham, Hampshire	Latin, Winchester, Old Minster	Edgar
823	1154		A.D. 963 x 975		the church of Winchester	Restoration of 60 hides (mansae) at Farnham, Surrey, and 10 hides (cassati) at Bentley, near Alton, Hampshire	Latin, Winchester, Old Minster	Edgar
824	1152		A.D. 963 x 975		the church of Winchester	Grant of 20 hides (mansae) at Overton with woodland at Tadley, 15 hides at (North) Waltham and 5 at Bradley, all in Hampshire	Latin, Winchester, Old Minster	Edgar
825	1149		A.D. 963 x 975		the bishopric of Winchester	Confirmation of 100 hides (mansae) at Taunton, Somerset, with 3 appurtenant hides at Cearn (? Charmouth, Dorset) and 2 at Washford, Somerset, originally acquired from King Edward in exchange for 30 hides at Banwell, Somerset, 20 at Stoce by Shalbourne, Wiltshire, and 10 at Crowcombe, Somerset.	Latin, Winchester, Old Minster	Edgar
826	1153		A.D. 963 x 975		the church of Winchester	Confirmation of 60 hides (cassati) at Tichborne, Beauworth and Ovington, Hampshire	Latin, Winchester, Old Minster	Edgar
827	1158		A.D. 963 x 975		the church of Winchester	Confirmation of 64 hides (mansae) at Twyford, Crawley, Owslebury, Hensting in Colden Common, Hampshire; Hortun; Bishopstoke, Otterbourne, Chilland in Martyr Worthy, Easton and Hunton, Hampshire	Latin, Winchester, Old Minster	Edgar
828		1276	A.D. 956 for 975 x 978		Ælfstan, bishop	Grant of 13 hides (mansae) at Kingston Bagpuize, Berkshire	Latin with English bounds, Abingdon	Edward the Martyr
829		1277	A.D. 965 for 975 x 978		St Mary's, Abingdon	Grant of 7 hides (cassati) at Kingston Bagpuize, Berkshire	Latin with English bounds, Abingdon	Edward the Martyr
830			A.D. 976 (Pydelan, ? Puddletown, Dorset)		Ælfsige	Grant of 1 pertica at Hypeles eald land (Treable in Cheriton Bishop), Devon.	Latin with English bounds, Exeter (ex Crediton)	Edward the Martyr
831		611	A.D. 977		Ælfric, his minister	Grant of 10 (mansae) at Wylye, Wiltshire	Latin with English bounds, Winchester, Old Minster	Edward the Martyr
832			A.D. 977		Æthelweard, comes	Grant of land at Traboe, Trevallack and Grugwith, all in St Keverne, and at Trethewey in St Martin-in-Meneage, Cornwall.	Latin with English bounds, Exeter	Edward the Martyr
832a			A.D. 894 for ? 994		Athelney Abbey	Grant of tithes from the royal estate at Somerton, Somerset, said on the authority of Archbishop Dunstan to have been previously instituted by King Alfred.	Latin, Athelney	Æthelred II
833	1096		A.D. 962		Leofric, minister	Grant of woodland (? at Claydons in Alveston, Warwickshire).	Latin with English bounds, Abingdon	Æthelred II
834		621	A.D. 979		Ælfhere, comes	Grant of 10 hides (mansae) at Olney, Buckinghamshire	Latin with English bounds, Peterborough	Æthelred II
835		622	A.D. 979		Æthelwold, bishop, and the church of SS Peter and Paul (Old Minster), Winchester	Grant of 5 hides (cassati) at Long Sutton, to be attached to the church's estate at Crondall, Hampshire The land, previously subject to Crondall, had been bequeathed to King Edgar by Æthelbriht, oeconomus. The original landbook was lost.	Latin with English bounds, Winchester, Old Minster	Æthelred II
836		626	A.D. 980		Old Minster, Winchester	Grant of 1.5 hides (mansae) at Calshot, Hampshire, for a fishery, in return for a gold bracelet.	Latin with English bounds, Winchester, Old Minster	Æthelred II
837		624	A.D. 980		the monks of Old Minster, Winchester	Grant of the reversion of 7 hides (cassati) at Havant, Hampshire, which had been granted by King Athelstan to Wihtgar, his thegn, for four lives (cf. S 430).	Latin with English bounds, Winchester, Old Minster	Æthelred II
838		629	A.D. 981		St Mary's Abbey, Tavistock, Devon	Grant of privileges, including free election of a new abbot.	Latin, Tavistock	Æthelred II
839		1278	A.D. 982		Ælfgar, his minister	Grant of 5 hides (cassati) in the common land at Charlton near Wantage, Berkshire	Latin, Abingdon	Æthelred II
840		633	A.D. 982		Leofric	Grant of 3 hides (mansae) and 30 iugera at Longstock, Hampshire	Latin with English bounds, Winchester, Old Minster	Æthelred II
841		632	A.D. 982		Abbot Æthelweard and Malmesbury Abbey	Grant of 10 hides (manentes) at Rodbourne, Wiltshire	Latin, Malmesbury	Æthelred II
842			A.D. 982		New Minster, Winchester	Confirmation of 13 hides (mansae), consisting of 7 hides (manentia) on the Isle of Wight at Heantune, Bathingbourne, Meolocdune and Stathe, together with 5 hides (cassata) at Fratton on Portsea Island, 1 at Segenworth in Titchfield and a meadow by the river Meon, Hampshire The lands had been forfeited by Lufa, sold for 100 mancuses by King Æthelred to Ealdorman Æthelmær, and bequeathed by Æthelmær to New Minster (cf. S 1498).	Latin with bounds in Old English, Middle English and Latin, Winchester, New Minster	Æthelred II
843		1279	A.D. 983		St Mary's, Abingdon	Grant of 2 hides (manentes) at Arncott, Oxfordshire	Latin with English bounds, Abingdon	Æthelred II
844		639	A.D. 983		Ælfnoth, his minister	Grant of 2.5 hides (mansae) at Westwuda (? Westwood, Wiltshire), previously held by Sealemudda (cf. rubric).	Latin, Winchester, Old Minster	Æthelred II
845		635	A.D. 983		Æthelgar, bishop (of Selsey)	Grant of a meadow (Hyde Moors) in the northern part of Winchester, Hampshire	Latin with bounds in Old English, Middle English and Latin, Winchester, New Minster	Æthelred II
846		638	A.D. 983		Æthelmær, dux	Grant of 10 hides (mansae) at Clyffe Pypard, Wiltshire	Latin with English bounds, Winchester, Old Minster	Æthelred II
847			A.D. 983		Æthelmær, his minister	Grant of 9 hides (cassati) at Thames Ditton, Surrey.	Latin with English bounds, Thorney	Æthelred II
848		636	A.D. 983		Æthelwine, his minister	Grant of 10 hides (mansae) at Clyffe Pypard, Wiltshire	Latin with English bounds, Winchester, Old Minster	Æthelred II
849		640	A.D. 983		Æthelwold, bishop	Grant of a fishery at Ginanhecce on the river Darent, Kent.	Latin with English bounds, Winchester, Old Minster	Æthelred II
850		641	A.D. 984		Shaftesbury Abbey	Confirmation of 20 hides (mansae) at Tisbury, Wiltshire, and woodland at Sfgcnyllebar (? Sedgehill bær).	Latin with English bounds, Shaftesbury	Æthelred II
851		1280	A.D. 983		Wulfgar, his man	Grant of 3 hides (mansae) at Drayton and 1.5 at Sutton, Berkshire	Latin, Abingdon	Æthelred II
852		1281	A.D. 984		Ælfheah, his minister	Grant of 2 hides (cassati) at Osanlea.	Latin with English bounds, Abingdon	Æthelred II
853			A.D. 984		Ælfwine, his scriptor	Grant of 6 hides (cassati) in the common land, consisting of 3 at Brighthampton, 2 at Aston Bampton, and 1 at Lew, Oxfordshire	Latin, Burton	Æthelred II
854		643	A.D. 984		the church of Bath	Grant of 3.5 hides (mansae) at Radstock, Somerset.	Latin with English bounds, Bath	Æthelred II
855		1282	A.D. 984		Brihtric, his minister	Grant of 8 hides (mansae) on the river Kennet (at Leverton near Hungerford, Berkshire), previously held by Ætheric, rusticus.	Latin with English bounds, Abingdon	Æthelred II
856		648	A.D. 985		Æthelric, his minister	Grant of 17 hides (cassati) at Harwell, Berkshire	Latin with English bounds, Winchester, Old Minster	Æthelred II
857		652	A.D. 985		Alfred, his amicus	Grant of 11 hides (mansae) at Michelmersh, Hampshire	Latin with English bounds, Winchester, Old Minster	Æthelred II
858		1283	A.D. 985		Leofwine, his minister	Grant of 10 hides (cassati) at Wootton, Berkshire	Latin with English bounds, Abingdon	Æthelred II
859		647	A.D. 985		Wulfric, his sacerdos	Grant of 1 hide (mansa), half at Borstealle (? Dorstealle) and half at Haestan dic and Cnollam.	Latin, Christchurch (Twynham)	Æthelred II
860		650	A.D. 985		Wulfrun	Grant of 10 hides (cassati), consisting of 9 at Wolverhampton and 1 (manens) at Trescott, Staffordshire	Latin with English bounds, Winchester, Old Minster	Æthelred II
861		655	A.D. 986		Ælfgar, his minister	Grant of 5 hides (manentes) at Ebbesborne, Wiltshire	Latin with English bounds, Winchester, Old Minster	Æthelred II
862		654	A.D. 986		Wenoth, his minister	Grant of 5 hides (mansiunculae) at Littleton on Severn, Gloucestershire	Latin with bounds, Malmesbury	Æthelred II
863			A.D. 987		Æthelsige, his minister	Grant of 12 hides (mansae) at Æsce.	Latin, Burton	Æthelred II
864		657	A.D. 987		Æthelsige, his minister	Grant of 10 sulungs (aratra) at Bromley, Kent.	Latin with English bounds, Rochester	Æthelred II
865			A.D. 987		Æthelwold	Grant of 10 hides (manentia) at Manningford Abbots, Wiltshire	Latin with bounds in Old English, Middle English and Latin, Winchester, New Minster	Æthelred II
866		659	A.D. 987		Glastonbury Abbey	Grant of 40 hides (mansae) at Kyngtune (cf. Kington St Michael and Kington Langley), Wiltshire, formerly purchased from King Edgar by Ælfswith, wife of Ælfheah, dux, for 40 mancuses of gold.	Latin, Glastonbury	Æthelred II
867		658	A.D. 987		Leofwine, his venator	Grant of 3 hides (mansae) at Westwood, Wiltshire, and 3 perticae in the common land at Farleigh Hungerford, Somerset.	Latin with English bounds, Winchester, Old Minster	Æthelred II
868		664	A.D. 988		Ælfgar, his minister, or, according to the rubric, bishop	Grant of 5 hides (mansae) at Wylye, Wiltshire, previously held by Æthelwold and his brother, Ælfhelm.	Latin with English bounds, Winchester, Old Minster	Æthelred II
869			A.D. 988 (16 April)		Æthelgar, bishop (of Selsey)	Grant of 7 hides (manentia) at South Heighton, Sussex, granted to Æthelgar by Ælfric, comes, in exchange for land at Lamburna.	Latin with bounds in Old English, Middle English and Latin, Winchester, New Minster	Æthelred II
870		665	A.D. 988		Æthelnoth, his faithful minister	Grant of a messuage (curtis) in Wilton, Wiltshire, associated with St Benedict's church.	Latin with English bounds, Wilton	Æthelred II
871			A.D. 988		Æthelsige, bishop (of Sherborne), and Æthelmær, the king's miles	Grant of a messuage (curtis) in Winchester, Hampshire, formerly belonging to Edgeard.	Latin, Glastonbury	Æthelred II
872		663	A.D. 988		Leofstan, his minister	Grant of 4 hides (mansae) at Colworth in Oving, Sussex, and a messuage (haga) in Chichester.	Latin with English bounds, Selsey	Æthelred II
873		662	A.D. 988 (23 March)		Northman, his minister	Grant of 5 hides (manentes) at Hampton, near Evesham, Worcestershire	Latin with English bounds, Evesham	Æthelred II
874		673	A.D. 990		Æthelweard, his minister	Grant of 15 hides (tributaria) at Wootton St Lawrence, Hampshire, with nine messuages (hagan) in Winchester, a meadow at Basingstoke and a mill at Hines clifæ.	Latin with English bounds, Winchester, Old Minster	Æthelred II
875		1283	A.D. 990		Sigered, his minister	Grant of 2 hides (cassati) at Sibertswold, Kent.	Latin, Canterbury, St Augustine's	Æthelred II
876		684	A.D. 993 (Winchester, Hants, Pentecost, ie 4 June; Gillingham, Dorset, 17 July)		Abingdon Abbey	Confirmation of privileges, including the right of free election of a new abbot.	Latin, Abingdon	Æthelred II
877			A.D. 996		Ælfthryth, his mother	Grant of 3.5 (sulunga) at Brabourne, 3.5 at Evegate, 2 at Burhwarefelda, 3 at Nackington, 3 at Chalk and 1 at Wirigenn (? Perry), Kent, forfeited by Wulfbald for many crimes. Ælfthryth gives in exchange land at Cholsey, Berkshire With an account of Wulfbald's forfeiture in English.	Latin with English and English bounds, Winchester, New Minster	Æthelred II
878			A.D. 996		Wulfric, his minister	Grant of 3 hides (cassati) at Abbots Bromley, Staffordshire	Latin with English bounds, Burton	Æthelred II
879			A.D. 996		Wulfric, his minister	Grant of land at Pillaton, near Penkridge, Staffordshire	Latin with English bounds, Burton	Æthelred II
880		686	A.D. 994		Ealdred, bishop of Cornwall	Grant of privileges.	Latin, Exeter (ex Bodmin)	Æthelred II
881		687	A.D. 994		St Mary's Church, Wilton	Grant of 10 hides (cassati) at Fovant, Wiltshire	Latin with English bounds, Wilton	Æthelred II
882		689	A.D. 995 for 994		Æscwig, bishop (of Dorchester)	Confirmation of 30 hides (mansiunculae) at Monks Risborough, Buckinghamshire The land had been sold to Æscwig by Sigeric, archbishop of Canterbury, for 90 pounds of silver and 200 mancuses of gold, in order to raise money to pay off the Danes threatening Canterbury.	Latin, Canterbury, Christ Church	Æthelred II
883		1289	A.D. 995		Æthelwig, his miles	Grant of 5 hides (mansi) at Ardley, Oxfordshire, forfeited by three brothers.	Latin with English bounds, Abingdon	Æthelred II
884			A.D. 995		Muchelney Abbey	Confirmation of estates, with particular reference to land at Ilminster, which had been leased out by the abbey and then lost, and land at Camel, Somerset, partly purchased by Abbot Leofric with Æthelred's alms and partly donated by Ealdorman Æthelmær.	Latin, Muchelney	Æthelred II
885		688	A.D. 995		the bishopric of Rochester	Restoration of 6 hides or sulungs (mansae or sulunga) at Wouldham and 1 hide (mansa) at Littlebrook, Kent, with swine-pastures in the Weald.	Latin with English bounds, Rochester	Æthelred II
886		692	A.D. 995		Wulfric (Spot), his minister	Grant of 2.5 hides (mansae) in the common land at Dumbleton, Gloucestershire, forfeited by Æthelsige for theft, granted by the king to Hawase, his man, and now exchanged by Hawase for other land belonging to Wulfric.	Latin with English, Abingdon	Æthelred II
887		1292	A.D. 996		Eadric, Eadwig and Ealdred, brothers	Grant of 2 hides (mansae) at Bynsingtun land (? Benson, Oxfordshire).	Latin with English bounds, Abingdon	Æthelred II
888		696	A.D. 996		St Albans Abbey	Grant of 8 hides (mansae) in St Albans, consisting of 4 at Burston in St Stephens and 4 at Wincelfelda (lost, also in St Stephens), and also 9 haga in the town, and 8 iugera at Westwick in St Michaels, Hertfordshire	Latin with English bounds, St Albans	Æthelred II
889		1291	A.D. 996		Old Minster Winchester	Restoration of a messuage (haga) in Winchester with a fishery at Bræge (Brentford, Middlesex). Ælfswith, matrona, had promised the Winchester haga to Old Minster after her death, but the bequest had been blocked.	Latin with English bounds, Winchester, Old Minster	Æthelred II
890			A.D. 997 (25 July)		Ælfwold, bishop	Grant of 2 hides (cassati) at Sandford, Devon.	Latin with English bounds, Exeter (ex Crediton)	Æthelred II
891		698	A.D. 997 (Calne, Wilts, and Wantage, Berks)		Old Minster, Winchester	Restoration of 100 hides (mansae), consisting of 55 at Downton and 45 at Ebbesborne, Wiltshire The land had been granted by King Cenwalh (cf. S 229), confirmed (?) by King Cynewulf, restored by King Egbert (cf. S 275) and again by King Eadred (cf. S 540) and King Edgar (cf. S 819, 821).	Latin with English bounds, Winchester, Old Minster	Æthelred II
892			A.D. 998		Leofwine, dux	Grant of 7.5 hides (tributarii), consisting of 3 hides (mansae) at Southam and 4.5 hides (manentes) at Ladbroke and Radbourne, Warwickshire The land had been forfeited by Wistan for murder.	Latin with English and English bounds, Coventry	Æthelred II
893		700	A.D. 998 (Easter)		St Andrew's church, Rochester	Restitution of 6 sulungs at Bromley, Kent, with swine-pastures in the Weald.	Latin with English bounds, Rochester	Æthelred II
894			A.D. 998		Westminster Abbey	Confirmation of privileges and of (a) 5 hides (mansae) at Westminster [formerly purchased by Dunstan from Edgar for 70 mancuses of gold]; (b) 3 at Logereslea (for Lothereslege, lost in Hendon), Middlesex [formerly held by Brihtmær, purchased by Dunstan for ú30 from King Edward and given to Winchester]; (c) 5 at Hampstead, Mddx [granted to Westminster by King Æthelred]; (d) 20 [at Hendon, Middlesex] [of which 10 were purchased by Dunstan from Bishop Æthelwold and 10 from Wulfnoth, miles, for 80 pounds of silver]; (e) 3 at Codanhlaw [purchased by Dunstan from Eadnoth, minister, for 12 pounds]; (f) 8 at Hanwell, Middlesex [acquired from Ælfwine for 30 pounds to enable him to go on pilgrimage, the arrangement to be reversed if he returned and repaid the money, the land meanwhile to be held by Dunstan for his lifetime, with reversion to Westminster]; (g) 10 at Sunbury [purchased by Dunstan from Ælfheah, dux, for 200 gold solidi, the reversion being given to Westminster after the life of a widow, Æthelflæd; (h) land at Shepperton, Middlesex. [to revert to Westminster after the death of Æthelflæd]; (i) 5 hides at Brickendon, Hertfordshire [bequeathed to Westminster by Ælfhelm Polga]; (j) 3 hides (cassati) at Sullington, Sussex [given by Ælfwine, the king's præfectus in Kent, for the soul of his wife]; (k) land at Paddington, Middlesex [to revert to Westminster after the death of Wulfric]; (l) land at Cowley Peachey, Middlesex [to revert after the death of Ælfric into the control of Bishop Wulfsige (of Sherborne)].	Latin, Westminster	Æthelred II
895		701	A.D. 998		Wulfsige, bishop, and Sherborne Abbey	Permission to convert the community to the Benedictine Rule, and confirmation of land at Stockland in Sherborne, Dorset; 9 hides (cassati) at Holcombe Rogus, Devon; 15 at Halstock, 7 at Thornford, 10 at Bradford Abbas, 5 at Oborne, 8 at Stalbridge Weston, 20 in Stalbridge, all in Dorset; 10 at Wulfheardigstoke; 8 at (Nether and Over) Compton, Dorset; 2 in Osanstoke; and 1 hide (mansa) at Lyme, Dorset.	Latin, Sherborne	Æthelred II
896		703	A.D. 999		St Mary's, Abingdon	Grant of 15 hides (cassati) at South Cerney, Gloucestershire	Latin with English bounds, Abingdon	Æthelred II
897		1294	A.D. 1000		Abingdon Abbey and Abbot Wulfgar	Grant of 5 hides (mansorum culturae), consisting of 3 at Drayton and 2 at Sutton Courtenay, Berkshire, formerly belonging to Wulfgar, the king's pincerna.	Latin, Abingdon	Æthelred II
898		705	A.D. 1001		Clofi	Grant of 25 hides (mansi) at Long Itchington and Arley, Warwickshire	Latin with English bounds, Coventry	Æthelred II
899		706	A.D. 1001		Shaftesbury Abbey	Grant of the cenobium of Bradford-on-Avon, Wiltshire, with land at Bradford.	Latin with English bounds, Shaftesbury	Æthelred II
900		1297	A.D. 1002		Ælfhelm, his faithful minister	Grant of 5 hides (mansae) at Codicote, Hertfordshire, in return for 152 mancuses of gold. (b) Ælfhelm grants the land to St Albans.	Latin with English bounds, St Albans	Æthelred II
901		1295	A.D. 1002		Ælfric, archbishop	Grant of 24 hides (mansae) at Dumbleton, Gloucestershire, including land comprising 17 hides to the west of the river Isbourne (i.e. at Dumbleton), 2 hides in the common land at Aston Somerville, Gloucestershire, and 5 hides of woodland at Fleferth (? Kington near Flyford Flavell, Worcestershire), in return for 50 talents. The land had been forfeited by a woman for adultery.	Latin with English bounds, Abingdon	Æthelred II
902		1296	A.D. 1002		Godwine, his faithful minister	Grant of 10 hides (mansae) at Little Haseley, Oxfordshire, in return for 30 mancuses of gold.	Latin with English bounds, Abingdon	Æthelred II
903			A.D. 1002		Westminster Abbey	Grant of 2 hides (mansae) at Berewican, near Tyburn, Middlesex, in return for 100 mancuses of gold.	Latin with English bounds, Westminster	Æthelred II
904		707	A.D. 1002		Abbess Heanflæd and Wherwell Abbey	Grant of privileges and confirmation of 70 hides (mansae) in the vicinity of the abbey, and grant of 60 hides (cassati) at Æthelingadene (East and West Dean, Sussex), previously belonging to Queen Ælfthryth. With note, in Latin and English, dated 1008, confirming 29 messuages in Winchester to the abbey and granting 10 hides (mansae) at Bullington, Hampshire	Latin with English, Wherwell	Æthelred II
905			A.D. 1003 for 1002 (Canterbury, 11 July)		Æthelred, his faithful man	Lease, for the lives of himself and his wife, of land in Canterbury and of 6 agri outside the city, in return for 7 pounds, with reversion to Christ Church, Canterbury.	Latin with English bounds, Canterbury, Christ Church	Æthelred II
906		710	A.D. 1004		Burton Abbey	Confirmation of privileges and lands granted by Wulfric as in his will (S 1536). The estates in question are Dumbleton, Gloucestershire; in south Lancashire; in Wirral; at Rolleston, Harlaston, Staffordshire; Beorelfestune (? Barlaston, Staffordshire or Barlestone, Leicestershire); Marchington, Staffordshire; Conisborough, Yorkshire W.R.; Alvaston, Derbyshire; Northtune (? Norton juxta Twycross, Leicestershire); Elford, Oakley, Tamworth, Balterley, Staffordshire; Walesho (? Wales, WRY); Thorpe Savin, WRY; Whitwell, Clowne, Barlborough, Duckmanton, Mosborough, Eckington, Beighton, Derbyshire; Doncaster, WRY; Morlingtune; Austrey, Warwickshire; Palterton, Derbyshire; Wibtoft, Warwickshire; Twongan (? Tonge, Leicestershire, or Tong, Shropshire); Burton upon Trent, Stretton, Bromley, Pillaton, Gailey, Whiston, Staffordshire; Laganford (? Longford, Shropshire); Stirchley, Staffordshire; Niwantun æt thære wic (probably Newton by Middlewich, Cheshire); Wædedun, Niwantun (? Newton Solney, Derbyshire); Winshill, Staffordshire; Suttun; Ticknall, Derbyshire; Shenton, Wigston Parva, Lecis.; Halen (? Hawne in Halesowen, Worcestershire); Hremesleage (? Romsley, Shropshire); Shiplea, Shropshire; Suthtune (? Sutton Maddock, Shropshire); Actune (? Acton Trussel in Baswich, Staffordshire); Darlaston, Rudyard, Cotwalton, Church Leigh, Staffordshire; Okeover, Ilam, Cauldon, Derbyshire; Castern, Staffordshire; Suthtune (? Sutton on the Hill, Derbyshire); Morley, Breadsall, Morton, Pilsley, Ogston, North Wingfield, Snodeswic, Derbyshire; Tathwell, Lincolnshire; Appleby Magna, Leicestershire; Weston in Arden, Burton Hastings, Warwickshire; Sharnford, Leicestershire; Harbury, Warwickshire; Aldsworth, Arlington, Gloucestershire; Eccleshale (? Eccleshall, Staffordshire); Waddune; Sheen, Staffordshire; Langandune (? Longdon, Staffordshire); Bupton, Stretton, Derbyshire	Latin with English, Burton	Æthelred II
907		711	A.D. 1004		Ely Abbey	Grant of 20 hides (mansae) at Littlebury, Essex.	Latin with English bounds, Ely	Æthelred II
908		1300	A.D. 1004 x 1014			Confirms the grant by Æthelflæd to St Paul's, of 2 hides (mansae) at Laver, Essex, and 4 at Cockhampstead, Hertfordshire (cf. S 1495).	Latin, London, St Paul's	Æthelred II
909		709	A.D. 1004 (Headington, Oxon, 7 Decirca)		St Frideswide's Abbey, Oxford	Confirmation of 10 hides at Upper Winchendon, Buckinghamshire, and 3 at Whitehill in Tackley, 3 at Cowley, 3 at Cutslow, and land at Headington, all Oxfordshire	Latin with English bounds, Oxford, St Frideswide's	Æthelred II
910		1301	A.D. 1005		Eadsige, his minister (gerefa in rubric)	Grant of 1 hide (mansa) at Seaton, Devon, in return for 100 mancuses of gold.	Latin with English bounds, Sherborne (ex Horton)	Æthelred II
911		714	A.D. 1005		Eynsham Abbey	Confirmation of the foundation by Æthelmær, the endowment including (a) 30 hides (mansiunculae) at Eynsham [acquired from his father Æthelweard in exchange for 3 hides at Upottery, Devon; 10 at Little Compton, Warwickshire; 10 at Lawling in Latchingdon, Essex; and 13 at Scildforda]; (b) 5 hides at Shipton-on-Cherwell and the vill at Shifford, Oxon [granted by King Edgar to Brihtnoth, dux, and bequeathed by Leofwine to Æthelmær]; (c) Mickleton, Gloucestershire [granted by charter by King Edgar to Brihtnoth, and bequeathed by Brihtnoth to Æthelmær]; (d) 5 hides at Burton [given to Æthelmær by Æthelweard]; (e) 1.5 hides at Marlcliff in Bidford-on-Avon and 2 at Bentley in Holt, Worcestershire [among lands forfeited by Leoftæt, for which Æthelmær gave 30 pounds to King Edgar]; (f) 10 hides at Yarnton, Oxfordshire [acquired from Godwine, in exchange for 5 hides at Studley, Warwickshire or Oxfordshire, and 10 at Chesterton, Warwickshire or Oxfordshire]; (g) 20 hides at Esher, Surrey [granted by Brihthelm, bishop, to Æthelweard, and bequeathed by Æthelweard to his son, Æthelmær]; (h) land at Thames Ditton, Surrey (cf. S 847); and (i) Rameslege (lost, corresponds with Brede, Sussex) [bequeathed to Eynsham by Wulfin (Wulfwyn), Æthelmær's kinswoman].	Latin with English and English bounds, Eynsham	Æthelred II
912		672	A.D. 1005		St Albans Abbey	Grant of 1 hide (cassata) at Flamstead and 5 at St Albans, Hertfordshire, with renewal of extensive liberties granted by King Offa. Abbot Leofric had given 200 pounds of gold and silver to the king to pay off the Danes, receiving in exchange these 6 hides and 55 hides at Eadulfinctun; but now he has returned Eadulfinctun.	Latin with English bounds, St Albans	Æthelred II
913			A.D. 1005		the bishopric of St Davids (Deowiesstow)	Grant of land at Over in Almondsbury, Gloucestershire (with reversion to the church of Worcester after 3 lives, MS 1 only).	Latin, Worcester	Æthelred II
914		715	A.D. 1006 for 1002		Christ Church, Canterbury	Refoundation of the monastic community and confirmation of land at Eastry, Ickham, Bossington, Adisham, Appledore, Swarling, Preston, Graveney, Westwell, Chart and Farleigh, Kent; at Patching, Sussex; at Meopham and Cooling in West Kent; at Walworth, Surrey; at Risborough, Buckinghamshire; at Lawling in Latchingdon, Essex; at Hadleigh and Monks Eleigh, Suffolk; and in Thanet, Kent.	Latin and English versions, Canterbury, Christ Church	Æthelred II
915		1303	A.D. 1007 (Beorchore)		Ælfgar, his prepositus	Grant of 8 hides (mansi) at Waltham St Lawrence, Berkshire, in return for 300 mancuses of gold and silver.	Latin with English bounds, Abingdon	Æthelred II
916		1304	A.D. 1007		St Albans Abbey	Grant of land at Norton, 1 hide (mansa) at Rodanhangra and land at Oxhey, Hertfordshire, originally granted to the abbey by King Offa but subsequently lost, and later forfeited to King Æthelred by Leofsige, dux, and purchased for St Albans by Archbishop Ælfric and Abbot Leofric.	Latin with English bounds, St Albans	Æthelred II
917			A.D. 1007		an unnamed minister	Grant of land at an unspecified place.	Latin, Burton	Æthelred II
918		1305	A.D. 1008		St Mary's, Abingdon	Restitution of 20 hides (mansi) at Moredon in Rodbourne Cheney, Wiltshire, and grant of a prediolum at Cricklade, Wiltshire	Latin with English bounds, Abingdon	Æthelred II
919		725	A.D. 1008		Ely Abbey	Grant of 19 hides (cassati), consisting of 2 hides (mansae) at Hadstock and 10 at Stretley Green in Littlebury, Essex; and 7 at Linton, Cambridgeshire, in return for 9 pounds of pure gold.	Latin, Ely	Æthelred II
920			A.D. 1008		Wulfgeat, abbot, and Burton Abbey	Grant of 2.5 hides (cassati) at Rolleston, Staffordshire, in exchange for the vills of Aldsworth and Arlington, Gloucestershire	Latin with English bounds, Burton	Æthelred II
921		1306	A.D. 1009		Athelney Abbey	Grant of 3 perticae at Hamp, near Bridgewater, Somerset.	Latin with English bounds, Athelney	Æthelred II
922			A.D. 1009		Morcar, his minister	Grant of 8 hides (manentes) at Weston upon Trent, 1 at Marley, 1 at Smalley and Kidsley, 1 at Crich, and 1 at Ingleby, Derbyshire Bounds of Weston.	Latin with English bounds, Burton	Æthelred II
923			A.D. 1011		Elemod, his minister	Grant of 2 hides (cassatae) at Hallam, Derbyshire, in return for 21 pounds of gold.	Latin, Burton	Æthelred II
924			A.D. 1011		Morcar, his minister	Grant of 5 hides (mansae) at Ufre (? Mickleover, Derbyshire).	Latin, Burton	Æthelred II
925		720	A.D. 1012		Ælfgifu, his wife	Grant of a predium in Winchester, Hampshire, with a church dedicated to St Peter, built by Æthelwine, præfectus.	Latin with English bounds, Winchester, Old Minster	Æthelred II
926		719	A.D. 1012		Godwine, bishop of Rochester	Grant of 15 hides (mansae) at Fen Stanton and Hilton, Huntingdonshire, previously fofeited by Æthelflæd for helping her exiles brother, Ealdorman Leofsige.	Latin, Rochester	Æthelred II
927		1307	A.D. 1012 or 1013 (June or July)		Leofric, his faithful minister	Grant of 10 hides (cassati) at Whitchurch, Oxfordshire, forfeited by a different Leofric.	Latin with English bounds, Abingdon	Æthelred II
928			A.D. 1012		Morcar, his minister	Grant of 2 hides (mansae) at Ecgintune (probably Eckington, Derbyshire).	Latin, Burton	Æthelred II
929			A.D. 1012		Theodulf, his man	Grant of 5 hides (cassati) at Burtune (? Burton Hastings, Warwickshire).	Latin, Burton	Æthelred II
930			A.D. 1012		Wulfgeat, abbot	Grant of 1.5 hides (manses) at Wetmoor, Staffordshire, in return for 70 pounds of gold and silver.	Latin with English bounds, Burton	Æthelred II
931		1308	A.D. 1013		Northman, miles	Grant of 3.5 hides (cassati) at Twywell, Northamptonshire	Latin with English bounds, Thorney	Æthelred II
931a			A.D. 1013 (18 April)		Sigered	Grant of 20 hides (mansae) at Hatfield, Essex.	Latin, Barking	Æthelred II
931b			A.D. 1013 (20 April)		Sigered, his minister	Grant of 5 hides (mansiunculae) at (East or West) Horndon, Essex.	Latin, Barking	Æthelred II
932			A.D. 1014		Leofwine, dux	Grant of 4 hides (mansae) at Mathon, Herefordshire	Latin, Pershore	Æthelred II
933		1309	A.D. 1014		Sherborne Abbey	Grant of 13 or 16 hides (mansiunculae) at Corscombe, Dorset. The estate had belonged to Sherborne in Edgar's reign, been leased out for two lives and then sold to Ealdorman Eadric, and later bought back by Wulfgar, famulus of Sherborne.	Latin with English bounds, Sherborne	Æthelred II
934		1310	A.D. 1015		Brihtwold, bishop	Grant of 5 hides (mansiunculae) at Chilton, Berkshire, forfeited by Wulfgeat, minister.	Latin with English bounds, Abingdon	Æthelred II
935		723	A.D. 1016		Evesham Abbey	Restitution of 1 hide (mansa) at Maugersbury, Gloucestershire, seized by Wulfric Ripa.	Latin with English bounds, Evesham	Æthelred II
936			A.D. 1028		Godwine, his miles	Grant of 5 hides (mansae) at Lytlacotan.	Latin, Thorney	Æthelred II
937		1312	A.D. 990 x 1006, perhaps 999		St Mary's, Abingdon	Grant of land at Farnborough and Wormleighton, Warwickshire, and South Cerney, Gloucestershire [seized by Ælfric, dux, from a widow, Eadflæd, forfeited by him and restored to Eadflæd, and bequeathed by Eadflæd to King Æthelred]; and at Pyrian (? Wood- or Waterperry, Oxfordshire) [given to King Æthelred by Æthelweard, son of Ceolflæd], in compensation for the loss of land at Hurstbourne, Hampshire, and at Bedwyn and Burbage, Wiltshire [granted to Abingdon by King Edgar and confiscated by King Edward the Martyr].	Latin, Abingdon	Æthelred II
938		1284	No date.		Atsere, his faithful minister	Grant of land at Wyke Regis, Dorset.	Latin with English bounds, Winchester, Old Minster	Æthelred II
939		704	A.D. 995 x 999 (Cookham)			Confirms the will of Æthelric (i.e. S 1501), including the bequest of land at Bocking, Essex, to Christ Church, Canterbury.	English, Canterbury, Christ Church	Æthelred II
940		718	A.D. 1006 x 1011		St Peter's Abbey, Chertsey	Grant of privileges at a wharf near Fischuthe in London bequeathed to Chertsey Abbey by Wulfstan, the king's priest.	Latin, Chertsey	Æthelred II
941		1311	No date.		St Paul's	Confirmation of lands.	Latin, London, St Paul's	Æthelred II
942		712	[A.D. 990]		the church of St Peter and All Saints, South Stoneham, Hants.	Grant of 10 hides (mansae) at Hinton Ampner, Hampshire	Latin with English bounds, Winchester, Old Minster	Æthelred II
943			A.D. 1006 x 1011		Toti, a Dane	Grant of 1 hide (mansus) at Beckley and 5 at Horton, Oxfordshire, in return for a pound of silver.	Latin with English bounds, Thorney	Æthelred II
944		713	[A.D. 990]		?	Grant of 8 hides (mansae) at Weston in South Stoneham, Hampshire	Latin with English bounds, Winchester, Old Minster	Æthelred II
945			A.D. 978 x 1016			Writ of King Æthelred; declaring that his priests in St Paul's minster are to have their sake and soke within borough and without, and as good laws as ever they had in the days of any king or bishop.	English, London, St Paul's	Æthelred II
946		642	A.D. 984 x 1001			Writ of King Æthelred; declaring that the land at Chilcomb, Hampshire, is now to be assessed for the discharge of all the obligations upon it at 1 hide, as had been established by his ancestors.	English, Winchester, Old Minster	Æthelred II
947		726	A.D. 1016		'New Minster' (? at Peakirk)	Grant of 1.5 hides (mansae) at Peakirk and 3 perticae at Walton near Peterborough, Northamptonshire, previously belonging to Siuerthus (Sigeferth).	Latin, Peterborough	Edmund Ironside
948	809		A.D. 1015 x 1016		Thorney Abbey	Grant of 5 hides (mansae) at Lakenheath, Suffolk.	Latin with English bounds, Thorney	Edmund Ironside
949			A.D. 1017 x 1032		Fécamp Abbey	Grant of land at Rammesleah with its port, Sussex.	Latin, Fécamp	Cnut
950			A.D. 1018		Archbishop Ælfstan	Grant of a copse called Hæselersc (Lower Hazelhurst) in Ticehurst, Sussex.	Latin with English bounds, Canterbury, Christ Church	Cnut
951		728	A.D. 1018		Burhwold, bishop	Confirmation of a grant made by King Edmund (Ironside) of 4 hides (cassatae) at Landrake and at Tinnell in Landulph, Cornwall, in exchange for land at Throwleigh, Devon. The land at Landrake to revert on the bishop's death to St German's.	Latin with English and English bounds, Exeter (ex St Germans)	Cnut
952		727	A.D. 1018		Christ Church, Canterbury	Confirmation of privileges.	Latin, Canterbury, Christ Church	Cnut
953			A.D. 1018		St German's minster, Cornwall	Grant of privileges.	Latin, Exeter (ex St Germans)	Cnut
954		729	A.D. 1019		Æthelwold, abbot, and the brethren of St Mary's, Exeter	Confirmation of privileges. The community's earlier landbooks had been burnt when the minster was destroyed by the Danes.	Latin, Exeter	Cnut
955		730	A.D. 1019		Agemund (Agmundr), his minister	Grant of 16 hides (cassati) at Cheselbourne, Dorset.	Latin with English bounds, Shaftesbury	Cnut
956			A.D. 1019 (first week of Easter)		New Minster, Winchester	Restoration of 5 hides (cassati) at Drayton, Hampshire The estate had been granted to a young man of Winchester who had wrongly informed Cnut that it was royal property.	Latin with English bounds, Winchester, New Minster	Cnut
957		1316	A.D. 1020	King Cnut and Ælfgifu (Emma), his wife	Evesham Abbey	Grant of 4 hides (mansae) at Badby and Newnham, Northamptonshire	Latin, Evesham	Cnut
958		734	A.D. 1022 (St Æthelthryth's Day = 23 June)		Abbot Leofric and Ely Abbey	Grant of land at Wood Ditton, Cambridgeshire, in exchange for land at Cheveley, Cambridgeshire	Latin, Ely	Cnut
959		737	A.D. 1023		Christ Church, Canterbury	Grant of the port of Sandwich.	Latin and English versions, Canterbury, Christ Church	Cnut
960		739	A.D. 1023		Leofwine Bondansunu, minister	Confirmation of 7 hides (cassati) at Hannington, Hampshire, obtained from King Æthelred in return for a weight of gold equivalent to one pound of silver.	Latin with English bounds, Winchester, Old Minster	Cnut
961		741	A.D. 1024		Orc, his minister	Grant of 7 hides (mansae) at Portesham (alias Portisham), Dorset.	Latin with English bounds, Abbotsbury	Cnut
962		743	A.D. 1026		Lyfing, bishop (of Crediton)	Grant of 5 hides (cassatae) at Abbots Worthy, Hampshire	Latin with English bounds, Winchester, Old Minster	Cnut
963		744	A.D. 1031		Æthelric, minister	Grant of a half hide (mansa) at Meavy, Devon.	Latin with English bounds, Exeter (ex Crediton)	Cnut
964		746	A.D. 1032		Abingdon Abbey	Grant of 2 hides (manentes) at Lyford, Berkshire, and of St Martin's monasteriolum with adjacent prediolum in Oxford.	Latin with English bounds, Abingdon	Cnut
965		748	A.D. 1032		Crowland Abbey	Confirmation of privileges and lands, including Crowland itself and the marshes of Alderlound and Goggislound.	Latin, Crowland	Cnut
966		747	A.D. 1032 (Glastonbury)		the church of St Mary, Glastonbury	Grant and confirmation of privileges.	Latin, Glastonbury	Cnut
967		751	A.D. 1033		Siward, abbot, and the brethren of Abingdon Abbey	Grant of 3 hides (cassati) at Myton, Warwickshire	Latin with English bounds, Abingdon	Cnut
968		749	A.D. 1033		Ælfric, archbishop of York	Grant of 43 hides (cassati) at Patrington, Yorkshire	Latin with English bounds, York	Cnut
969		1318	A.D. 1033		Bovi, his faithful minister	Grant of 7 hides (mansae) at Horton, Dorset.	Latin with English bounds, Sherborne	Cnut
970		752	A.D. 1033		Godwine, dux	Grant of 10 hides (mansae) at Poolhampton in Overton, Hampshire	Latin with English bounds, Winchester, Old Minster	Cnut
971			A.D. 1031		Hunuwine, minister	Grant of 1 hide (mansa) at Stoke Canon, Devon.	Latin with English bounds, Exeter/Christ Church, Canterbury (? ex Crediton)	Cnut
972		750	A.D. 1033		Old Minster, Winchester	Grant of 3 hides (mansae) at Bishops Hull, Somerset.	Latin with English bounds, Winchester, Old Minster	Cnut
973			A.D. 1034		St Mary's, Abingdon	Grant of 3 hides (manentes) at Myton, Warwickshire	Latin, Abingdon	Cnut
974			A.D. 1035		Bishop Eadsige	Grant of a half sulung (aratrum) at Berwick in Lympne, Kent.	Latin with English bounds, Canterbury, Christ Church	Cnut
975		1322	A.D. 1035		Sherborne Abbey	Grant of 16 hides (mansae) at Corscombe, Dorset.	Latin with English bounds, Sherborne	Cnut
976		753	A.D. 1035		Old Minster, Winchester	Renewal of privileges.	Latin and English versions, Winchester, Old Minster	Cnut
977		736	A.D. 1021 x 1023		Æfic, monk	Grant of 5 hides (cassaturae) at Newnham, Northamptonshire	Latin with English bounds, Evesham	Cnut
978		1320	A.D. 1016 x 1035		Ælfwine, bishop of London	Confirmation of the lands of St Paul's.	Latin, London, St Paul's	Cnut
979		1324	A.D. circa 1023 x 1032		Æthelwine, abbot, and the brethren of Athelney	Grant of 2 hides (mansae) less 1 pertica at Seavington, Somerset.	Latin, Athelney	Cnut
980		735	A.D. 1021 x 1023		Bury St Edmunds Abbey	Grant of privileges and of renders of fish from Welle (Upwell and Outwell, Norfolk) and of eels from Lakenheath, Suffolk.	Latin and English versions, Bury St Edmunds	Cnut
981		1327	No Date. (Kingston-on-Thames, Surrey, Pentecost)		Christ Church, Canterbury	Reversionary grant of land at Folkestone, Kent, after the death of Eadsige, the king's priest.	English and Latin versions, Canterbury, Christ Church	Cnut
982			A.D. 1028 x 1035		F&eacutecamp Abbey and Abbot John	Grant of land at Brede and Rammesleah, with its port, and 'two parts' of the tolls at Winchelsea, Sussex, with confirmation (A.D. 1040 x 1042) by King Harthacnut.	Latin, Fécamp	Cnut
983			A.D. 1016 x 1035		Godwine	Grant of 5 hides (mansae) at Lytlacotan.	Latin, Thorney	Cnut
984		740	A.D. 1020 x 1022		the Abbey of St Benet of Holme	Grant of Horning with Ludham and Neatishead, Norfolk.	Latin with English, St Benedict of Holme	Cnut
985		731	A.D. 1017 x 1020			Writ of King Cnut; declaring that he has confirmed, at the request of Archbishop Lyfing, the liberties of Christ Church.	English, Canterbury, Christ Church	Cnut
986			A.D. 1020			Writ of King Cnut; declaring that he has granted to Archbishop Æthelnoth judicial and financial rights over his own men, and over Christ Church, and over as many thegns as the king has granted him to have.	English, Canterbury, Christ Church	Cnut
987		1323	A.D. 1035			Writ of King Cnut; declaring that Archbishop Æthelnoth is to continue to discharge the obligations on the lands belonging to the archbishopric at the same rate as he has done hitherto, both before and after the appointment of Æthelric as reeve.	English, Canterbury, Christ Church	Cnut
988		1325	A.D. 1035			Writ of King Cnut; declaring that he has granted to Archbishop Æthelnoth all the landed property that Ælfmær had.	English, Canterbury, Christ Church	Cnut
989		756	No date.			Writ of King Cnut; declaring that he has granted to the brethren of St Augustine's judicial and financial rights over their own men, and over all the alodiaries whom he has given to them.	Latin, Canterbury, St Augustine's	Cnut
990		1326	A.D. 1027 x 1035			Writ of King Cnut; declaring that he has given to St Augustine the body of St Mildred with all her land and with all the 'customs' belonging to her church.	Latin, Canterbury, St Augustine's	Cnut
991		757	A.D. 1017 x 1030			Writ of King Cnut; declaring that he grants to Brihtwine 5 hides at Bengeworth, Worcestershire, for life, with reversion to Evesham Abbey.	Latin, Evesham	Cnut
992		1319	A.D. 1033 x 1035			Writ of King Cnut; declaring that his priests in St Paul's minster shall be entitled to judicial and financial rights as fully and completely in all things as ever they had them in any king's day.	English, London, St Paul's	Cnut
993		762	A.D. 1042 (Sutton Courtenay, Berks)			King Harthacnut to Abingdon Abbey; grant of 10 hides (mansae) at Farnborough, Berkshire	Latin with English bounds, Abingdon	Harthacnut
994		763	A.D. 1042		Ælfwine, bishop of Winchester	Grant of 1 hide (mansa) at Seolescumb (probably Coomb in East Meon, Hampshire).	Latin with English bounds, Winchester, Old Minster	Harthacnut
995		761	A.D. 1038 x 1039		St Edmunds Abbey	Grant of privileges.	Latin, Bury St Edmunds	Harthacnut
996		1331	A.D. 1040 x 1042			Writ of King Harthacnut; declaring that Abbot Athelstan of Ramsey is to have his mansus in Thetford, Norfolk, as fully and freely as he had it in the days of King Cnut.	Latin, Ramsey	Harthacnut
997		1330	A.D. 1040 x 1042			Writ of King Harthacnut; and his mother Queen Ælfgifu declaring that they have given to the church of Ramsey land at Hemingford Grey, Huntingdonshire	Latin, Ramsey	Harthacnut
997a			A.D. 1006 for 1016	Edward, son of King Æthelred	St Peter's Abbey, Ghent	Undertaking to restore land at Lewisham, Greenwich and Woolwich, Kent.	Latin, Ghent, St Peter's	Edward the Confessor
998		1332	A.D. 1042		Ordgar, his faithful minister	Grant of a half hide (mansa) at Littleham, Devon.	Latin with English bounds, Sherborne (ex Horton)	Edward the Confessor
999		767	A.D. 1043		Ælfstan, his minister	Grant of 10 hides (mansae) at Sevington in Leigh Delamere, Wiltshire	Latin with English bounds, Abingdon	Edward the Confessor
1000		916	A.D. 1043		Coventry Abbey	Confirmation of privileges and of land, as granted by Leofric, dux, at Southam, Grandborough, Bishops Itchington, Honington, Kings Newnham, Ufton, Chadshunt, Priors Hardwick, Chesterton, Wasperton, Snohham, Birdingbury, Marston in Wolston, Long Marston, Ryton, Walsgrave on Sowe, Warwickshire; Salwarpe, Worcestershire; Easton, Ches.; Kilsby and Winwick, Northamptonshire; Burbage, Barwell, Scraptoft and Packington, Leicestershire [incorporating a privilege of Pope Alexander].	Latin, Coventry	Edward the Confessor
1001		775	A.D. 1044		Ælfwine, bishop (of Winchester)	Grant of 30 hides (mansae) at Witney, Oxfordshire	Latin with English bounds, Winchester, Old Minster	Edward the Confessor
1002		771	A.D. 1044		Abbot Richard and St Peter's, Ghent	Confirmation and grant of privileges and of land at Lewisham, Greenwich, Woolwich, Mottingham, Coombe, Kent; with Æschore (possibly Ashour, Kent), Æffehaga; Wiggenden, Sharrington and Sandhurst, Kent; also part of the land in London called Wermanecher.	Latin, Ghent, St Peter's	Edward the Confessor
1003			A.D. 1044		Leofric, his chaplain	Grant of 7 hides (mansi) at Dawlish, Devon.	Latin with English bounds, Exeter	Edward the Confessor
1004		772	A.D. 1044		Orc, his faithful minister	Grant of 5 perticae at Abbots Wootton in Whitchurch Canonicorum, Dorset.	Latin with English bounds, Abbotsbury	Edward the Confessor
1005		770	A.D. 1044		Ordgar, his faithful minister	Grant of 1 pertica beneath Elddin (at Illand in Northill, Cornwall).	Latin with English bounds, Canterbury, Christ Church (ex a West Country archive)	Edward the Confessor
1006		774	A.D. 1044		Old Minster, Winchester	Grant of 15 hides (mansae) at Pitminster, Somerset.	Latin with English bounds, Winchester, Old Minster	Edward the Confessor
1007		780	A.D. 1045		Ælfwine, bishop of Winchester	Grant of 8 hides (mansae) at Hinton Ampner, Hampshire	Latin with English bounds, Winchester, Old Minster	Edward the Confessor
1008		781	A.D. 1045		Ælfwine, bishop of Winchester	Grant of 7 hides (cassati) at Millbrook, Hampshire	Latin with English bounds, Winchester, Old Minster	Edward the Confessor
1009			A.D. 1045		Godwine, dux	Grant of 7 hides (cassati) at Millbrook, Hampshire	Latin with English bounds, Winchester, Old Minster	Edward the Confessor
1010		778	A.D. 1045		Thorth, his minister	Grant of 2.5 hides (mansae) at Ditchampton, Wiltshire	Latin with English bounds, Wilton	Edward the Confessor
1011		779	A.D. 1045 (London, 1 Aug)		Westminster Abbey, Second Charter	Confirmation of privileges.	Latin, Westminster	Edward the Confessor
1012		776	A.D. 1045		Old Minster, Winchester	Grant of 8 hides (cassati) at South Stoneham, Hampshire	Latin with English bounds, Winchester, Old Minster	Edward the Confessor
1013		783	A.D. 1046		Ælfwine, bishop of Winchester	Grant of 6 hides (mansae) at Hoddington, Hampshire	Latin with English bounds, Winchester, Old Minster	Edward the Confessor
1014		784	A.D. 1046		Athelstan, his faithful minister	Grant of 3 hides (cassati) at Ayston, Rutland.	Latin with English bounds, Peterborough	Edward the Confessor
1015			A.D. 1046		the community of St Ouen, Rouen	Grant of land at Mersea, Essex.	Latin with English bounds, Rouen, St Ouen	Edward the Confessor
1016		1335	A.D. 1046		Old Minster, Winchester	Grant of land at Bransbury, Hampshire, and at Forde and Hertone saci.	Latin, Winchester, Old Minster	Edward the Confessor
1017			A.D. 1048		Tofig, his comes	Grant of 2 hides (territoria) at Berghe.	Latin, Burton	Edward the Confessor
1018		786	A.D. 1049 (Winchester)		Ælfwine, his militaris	Grant of 1 ploughland (carruga) at Hambledon, Hampshire	Latin, Winchester, Old Minster	Edward the Confessor
1019		787	A.D. 1049		Eadulf, his faithful minister	Grant of 1.5 perticae at Tregony and at Trerice in St Dennis, Cornwall.	Latin with English bounds, Canterbury, Christ Church, Canterbury (ex Bodmin, St Petroc's)	Edward the Confessor
1020		792	A.D. 1050		the church of St Mary, Abingdon	Grant of 8 hides (mansae) on the river Kennet (at Leverton in Hungerford, Berkshire), previously held by Eadric, rusticus.	Latin with English bounds, Abingdon	Edward the Confessor
1021		791	A.D. 1050			King Edward joins the two dioceses of Devon and Cornwall and transfers the seat of the united bishopric to Exeter.	Latin, Exeter	Edward the Confessor
1022		793	A.D. 1050		Godwine, dux	Grant of 4 hides (mansae) in the common land at Sandford-on-Thames, Oxfordshire	Latin with English bounds, Abingdon	Edward the Confessor
1023		796	A.D. 1052		the church of St Mary, Abingdon	Grant of 5 hides (cassati) at Chilton, Berkshire	Latin with English bounds, Abingdon	Edward the Confessor
1024		798	A.D. 1053		Lutrise (? Lutsige), his faithful minister	Grant of a half hide (mansa) at Bashley, Hampshire	Latin, Christchurch (Twynham)	Edward the Confessor
1025		800	A.D. 1054		the church of St Mary, Abingdon	Grant of 4 hides (mansae) in the common land at Sandford-on-Thames, Oxfordshire	Latin with English bounds, Abingdon	Edward the Confessor
1026		801	A.D. 1055		St Mary's, Evesham	Grant of 3 hides (cassati) at Upper Swell, Gloucestershire, in return for the abbot's gift of 6 marks of gold. The land had been forfeited by Erusius (? Earnsige), son of Oce.	Latin with English bounds, Evesham	Edward the Confessor
1027			A.D. 1059		Ealdred, bishop	Grant of land at Traboe, Trevallack and Grugwith, all in St Keverne, and at Trewethey in St Martin-in-Meneage, Cornwall.	Latin with English bounds, Exeter	Edward the Confessor
1028			A.D. 1059		St Denis	Grant of land at Taynton, Oxfordshire	Latin with English bounds, Paris, Saint-Denis	Edward the Confessor
1029		808	A.D. 1060		Peterborough Abbey	Confirmation of land at Fiskerton, Lincolnshire, bequeathed to the abbey by Leofgifu, a woman of London, but claimed by Queen Edith.	Latin, Peterborough	Edward the Confessor
1030		809	circa A.D. 1062 (30 Nov)		Ramsey Abbey	Confirmation of privileges and of land (a) at Upwood with Raveley, Hemingford (Grey), Huntingdonshire; Walsoken, Norfolk; Sawtrey, Huntingdonshire; Hilgay, Wells, Brancaster, Norfolk; Ripton, Stukeley, Huntingdonshire; Kingston (Wistow) with Raveley and Bury, Warboys, Slepe (St Ives), Huntingdonshire; Chatteris, Elsworth, Cambridgeshire; Houghton, Witton, Ellington, Bythorn, Brington, Huntingdonshire; Whiston, Isham, Northamptonshire; Weston, Huntingdonshire; Graveley, Cambridgeshire; Dillington, Huntingdonshire; Great Staughton, Norfolk; Yelling, Huntingdonshire; (b) and at Elton, Huntingdonshire; Barnwell, Hemington, Northamptonshire; East Elsworth, Girton, Cambridgeshire; Therfield, Hertfordshire; Shillington, Bedfordshire; Westmill, Hertfordshire; Offerton or Orfyridtune (lost) in Holland; Broughton, Huntingdonshire; Bottisham, Cambridgeshire [given by Æthelric, bishop of Dorchester]; (c) at Over, Barton, Knapwell, Cambridgeshire [given by Eadnoth, bishop of Dorchester]; (d) at Oakley (? in St Ives, Huntingdonshire) [given by Eadnoth, son of Godric]; (e) at Cranfield, Kempston, Clapham, Bedfordshire [given by Æthelwine Swearte]; (f) at Wispington, Lincolnshire; Lawshall, Suffolk; Martin, Lincolnshire; Wathinworth [given by Leofsige, deacon]; (g) at Marham on the Hill, Lincolnshire [given by Leofsige's nepos]; (h) at Burwell, Cambridgeshire [given by Ælfsige of Lampathe]; (i) at Quarrington, Lincolnshire [given by Iohol of Lincoln]; (j)and at Ringstead, Wimbotsham and Downham Market, Norfolk [given by King Harthacnut].	Latin, Ramsey	Edward the Confessor
1031			A.D. 1060		Westminster Abbey	Grant of 10 hides (mansae) in the common land at Wheathampstead, Hertfordshire	Latin with English bounds, Westminster	Edward the Confessor
1032		1341	A.D. 1061		Horton Abbey	Grant of privileges.	English, Sherborne (ex Horton)	Edward the Confessor
1033		810	A.D. 1061		St Mary's, Rouen	Grant of Ottery St Mary, Devon.	Latin with English bounds, Rouen, St Mary's	Edward the Confessor
1034		811	A.D. 1061		Wulfwold, abbot	Grant of land at Ashwick, Somerset.	Latin with English bounds, Bath	Edward the Confessor
1035		812	A.D. 1062		Chertsey Abbey	Confirmation of privileges and of land, consisting of 5 hides (mansae) at Chertsey, 10 at Thorpe, 10 at Egham, 10 at Chobham, 10 at Petersham, 7 at Tooting with Streatham, 7 at Mitcham and Sutton, 20 at Banstead with Suthmeresfelda (i.e. Canon's Farm in Banstead), 20 at Waddington with Coulsdon and Chaldon, 20 at Mertsham, 5 at Chipstead, 20 at Epsom, 6 at Cuddington, 5 at Tadworth, 20 at Bookham with Effingham, Dritham and Piccingawrthe, 20 at Cobham, 5 at Esher, 5 at Apps Court, 10 at East Clandon, 2 at West Clandon [bought by Abbot Wulfwold from Harold, comes, for 2 marks of gold in the presence of King Edward], 4 at Albury, 6 at Henley Park, Surrey; 10 at White Waltham, Berkshire; 8 at Byfleet with Weybridge, Surrey; 2 at Laleham [bought by Abbot Wulfwold from King Edward for 15 marks of silver] and 1 at Ashford, Middlesex	Latin, Chertsey	Edward the Confessor
1036		813	A.D. 1062		Waltham Abbey	Grant of privileges and confirmation of land at Waltham, Northland in Waltham, Paslow in High Ongar, South Weald, Upminster, Walhfare (? Walter Hall) in Boreham, Debden and Alderton in Loughton, Woodford, Essex; Lambeth, Surrey; Nazeing, Essex; Brickendon, Hertfordshire; Millow, Arlesey, Bedfordshire; Wormley, Hertfordshire; Netteswell, Essex; Hitchin, Hertfordshire; Luckington (or Loughton), Essex; and White Waltham, Berkshire	Latin with English bounds, Waltham	Edward the Confessor
1037		814	A.D. 1063		St Olave (Exeter)	Grant of land at Kenbury, Devon, and at Lan....	Latin, Exeter, St Olave	Edward the Confessor
1037a			A.D. 1065 (Winchester, 31, Decirca)		Archbishop Ealdred	Grant of the see of Worcester.	Latin, York	Edward the Confessor
1038		817	A.D. 1065		Malmesbury Abbey	Confirmation of privileges and of land, consisting of (a) 30 hides at Long Newnton [granted by King Æthelred], (b) 30 at Kemble of which 4 were at Chelworth in Crudwell, and 35 at Purton [granted by King Cædwalla to Abbot Aldhelm], (c) 40 at Crudwell, including Eastcourt, Hankerton and Murcott, 20 at Charlton near Malmesbury, and 10 at Dauntsey [granted by King Æthelwulf], (d) 10 at Wootton Bassett, 38 at Bremhill, including Euridge in Colerne, Spirthill in Bremhill, Chedecotun, Foxham and Avon in Bremhill, 5 at Norton, Wiltshire; 5 at Somerford (? Somerford Keynes), Gloucestershire [all granted by King Athelstan]; (e) 50 at Brokenborough [granted by King Eadwig], (f) 50 (?) at Grittenham, 10 at Sutton Benger, 10 at Rodbourne, 10 at Corston, 3 at Cusfalde (Cole Park), 2 at Bremilham, (g) 5 at Brinkworth [granted by Leofsige, uir nobilis], (h) and 11 at Highway in Hilmartin [granted by King Æthelred], all in Wiltshire; (i) and 5 at Littleton on Severn, Gloucestershire [granted by Wernoth, with the consent of King Æthelred].	Latin, Malmesbury	Edward the Confessor
1039			A.D. 1065 (28 Decirca)		Westminster Abbey, the Telligraphus of Edward	Confirmation and grant of privileges and of lands at Westminster, Berwyka in Tottenhale (Tottenham Court), Knightsbridge, Paddington, Hampstead, Hendon with Bleccenham (lost, in Hendon), Kingsbury, Middlesex; Tytebirste; Greneuorthe (? for Greenford, Middlesex); Hanwell, Middlesex; Mapulderforde (? for Maplestead, Essex); Aldenham, Hertfordshire; Dachewelle (? for Datchworth, Hertfordshire); Watton-at-Stone, Holwell, Hertfordshire; Sunbury, Shepperton, Littleton, Hanworth, Middlesex); Sippenham; Eastburneham (? Eastbourne, Sussex), with Rotherwica; Morden, Surrey; Ewell, Kent; Parham, Chollington in Eastbourne, West Chiltington, Sussex; Ham, Essex; Sunnitune; Fanton in North Benfleet, Bowers Gifford, Essex; Lenlevedune (? Kelvedon in Kelvedon Hatch, Essex); Deene, Sudborough, Northamptonshire; Perton, Staffordshire; Denham, Buckinghamshire; Moulsham, Kelvedon, Rayne, Latchingdon, Wanstead, Leyton, Paglesham, Essex; Lessness, Kent; Claygate, Surrey; Ayot St Lawrence, Wormley, Hertfordshire; Amersham, Weedon, Buckinghamshire; Islip, Launton, Oxfordshire; Staines, Middlesex; Windsor, Berkshire; Wheathampstead, Hertfordshire; Stevenage, Hertfordshire; Rutland; and Deerhurst, Gloucestershire	Latin, Westminster	Edward the Confessor
1040			A.D. 1065		Westminster Abbey	Confirmation and grant of privileges and confirmation of land, consisting of (a) 17.5 hides (mansae) at Westminster, 20 at Hendon, 5 at Hampstead, 12 at Greenford, 8 at Hanwell, 5 at Shepperton, 7 at Sunbury, 2 at Cowley, Middlesex; 5 at Brickendon, 10 at Aldenham, 5 at Datchworth and Watton-at-Stone, 6 at Holwell, Hertfordshire; 5 at Kelvedon (?), 4 at Fanton in North Benfleet, Essex; 10 at Morden, Surrey; 2 at Ewell, Kent; 7 at Parham, 4 at Chillington in Eastbourne, 4 at West Chiltington, Sussex; 6 at Ham, 4 at Wennington, Essex; (b) Moulsham [granted by Leofcild], Kelvedon Hatch (?) [granted by Æthelric], Maplestead [granted by Wulfwine], Kelvedon, Rayne and Latchingdon [granted by Guthmund], Wanstead [granted by Ælfric], Paglesham [granted by Ingulph], Leyton [granted by Atsere Swearte], Essex; Claygate, Surrey [granted by Tostig]; Lessness, Kent [granted by Atsere]; Ickworth, Suffolk [granted by Brihtsige]; Denham [granted by Wulfstan], 1 hide at Amersham and 1 at Weedon, Buckinghamshire [granted by Siward, monachus]; (c) and grant of land at Staines, Middlesex; Windsor, Berkshire; Wheathampstead, Stevenage, Ashwell, Hertfordshire; Deene, Sudborough, Northamptonshire; Islip, Launton, Oxfordshire; Perton, Staffordshire; Rutland [after the death of Queen Edith]; Pershore, Worcestershire; and Deerhurst, Gloucestershire	Latin, Westminster	Edward the Confessor
1041		825	A.D. 1065 (Westminster, 28 Decirca)		Westminster Abbey, Third Charter	Grant and confirmation of privileges.	Latin, Westminster	Edward the Confessor
1042		816	A.D. 1065 (Windsor, Berks, 20 or 24 May)		the bishopric of Wells	General confirmation of lands, comprising (a) 50 hides at Wells (formerly Tidingtun), with appurtenances at Polsham, Wookey, Henton, Yarley, Bleadney, Easton, Westbury, Wookey Hole, Ebbor, Burcott, (Upper and Lower) Milton, Pen Hill, East and West Horrington, Whitchurch, Dinder, Dulcote, Wellesley, Worminster, Chilcote, Binegar, Wanstrow, Litton; (b) 50 hides at Chew, with appurtenances at Littleton, Hæsele (Hazel Farm near Upper Littleton in Dundry), Dundry, (Bishops) Sutton, Sutton (Wick), Sutton (Court); (c) 20 hides at Evercreech, with Prestleigh, Chesterblade and (Stony) Stratton; (d) 38 hides at Kingsbury, with appurtenances at Lambrook, Readewelle, æt tham Beorge, Littleney (lost) in Huish, Huish Episcopi, Combe St Nicholas, Pibsbury, Chard, and other frusa Cerdren (? South Chard), Crimchard, Langham in Chard, Winsham, Congresbury and Banwell; (e) 15 hides at Wellington, with appurtenances at (West) Buckland, Ham, Huntanapoth, Harpford, Pinksmoor in Wellington Without and Chelston; (f) 15 hides at Wiveliscombe, with appurtenances at Nunnington, Upcott, Whitefield, Withycombe, Oakhampton, Langley, Ford, Pitsford, Fitzhead, the other Fifhyda, Dean, Slæp and Hwrentimor; (g) 15 hides at (Bishops) Lydeard, with appurtenances at (East) Combe, Padnoller (in Charlynch), Wuduland, Ash (Priors), Bagborough, Anacota and Hylle (? Lydeard Hill); (h) 4 hides at Wedmore, with appurtenances at Tarnock in Biddisham, Heawycan and Mark; all in Somerset. The diploma was written by Giso, bishop of Wells.	Latin, Wells	Edward the Confessor
1043		824	A.D. 1066 (Westminster, 28 Decirca)		Westminster Abbey, First Charter	Confirmation of privileges and of lands, comprising (a) 17.5 hides at Westminster, 20 at Hendon, 5 at Hampstead, 12 hides and 1 uirga at Greenford, 8 hides at Hanwell, 8 at Shepperton, 7 at Sunbury, Middlesex; 10 at Aldenham, 4 hides and 1 uirga at Datchworth, 4.5 hides at Watton(-at-Stone), 6.5 at Holwell, Hertfordshire; 2 at Ham, 4 at Wennington, 5 at Kelvedon (?), 4 at Fanton in North Benfleet, Essex; 10 at Morden, Surrey; 2 at Ewell, Kent; 7 at Parham, 3 at Chollington in Eastbourne, 4 at (West) Chiltington, Sussex; (b) Moulsham [granted by Leofcild], Kelvedon Hatch (?) [granted by Æthelric], Maplestead [granted by Wulfwine], Kelvedon, Rayne and Latchingdon [granted by Guthmund), Wanstead [granted by Ælfric], Leyton [granted by Ætsere Swearte], Paglesham [granted by Ingulf], Essex; Lessness, Kent [granted by Ætsere]; Claygate, Surrey [granted by Tostig]; Ayot St Lawrence, Hertfordshire [granted by Ælfwine]; Denham [granted by Wulfstan], a half hide at Amersham and 1 hide at Weedon, Buckinghamshire [granted by Siward]; 2.5 hides at Wormley, Hertfordshire [granted by Leofsige of London]; and (c) grant of land at Launton, Islip, Oxfordshire; Staines, Middlesex; Windsor, Berkshire; Wheathampstead, Hertfordshire; Stevenage, Ashwell, Hertfordshire; Deene, Sudborough, Northamptonshire; Perton, Staffordshire; Rutland [after the death of Queen Edith]; Pershore, Worcestershire; and Deerhurst, Gloucestershire	Latin, Westminster	Edward the Confessor
1044		769	A.D. 1042 x 1044		Æthelred, optimas	Grant of 2 hides (cassati) at West Cliffe, Kent.	Latin with English bounds, Canterbury, Christ Church	Edward the Confessor
1045		910	A.D. 1042 x 1065		St Edmunds Abbey	Confirmation and grant of privileges.	English and Latin versions, Bury St Edmunds	Edward the Confessor
1046		915	A.D. 1042 x 1066		St Edmunds	Confirmation of privileges and grant of land at Mildenhall, Suffolk, and eight and a half hundreds at Thingoe, Suffolk.	Latin and English versions, Bury St Edmunds	Edward the Confessor
1047		896	A.D. 1042 x 1066		Christ Church, Canterbury	Grant of land at Chartham, Kent, and Walworth, Surrey, and confirmation of land at Sandwich, Eastry, Folkestone, Thanet, Adisham, Ickham, Chartham, Godmersham, Westwell, East Chart, the other Chart, Berwick, Brook, Warehorne, Appledore, Mersham, Orpington, Preston, Meopham, Cooling, Farningham, Hythe, Hollingbourne, Farleigh, Peckham, all in Kent; at Patching and Wootton in Sussex; at Walworth, Merstham, Cheam, and Horsley in Surrey; at Southchurch, Laver, Milton (Hall) in Prittlewell, Lawling in Latchingdon, Bocking, St Osyth and Stisted in Essex; at Hadleigh and Monks Eleigh, Suffolk; at Monks Risborough in Buckinghamshire; and at Newington and Britwell Prior, Oxfordshire	English and Latin versions, Canterbury, Christ Church	Edward the Confessor
1048		900	A.D. 1042 x 1046		St Augustine's Abbey	Confirmation of lands and grant of St Mildrith's lands on Thanet, Kent.	Latin, Canterbury, St Augustine's	Edward the Confessor
1049		794	A.D. 1045 x 1050		Crowland Abbey	Confirmation of lands and privileges.	Latin, Crowland	Edward the Confessor
1050		1344	A.D. 1042 x 1050		Archbishop Eadsige	Grant of 1 sulung (aratrum) at Littlebourne, Kent.	Latin, Canterbury, St Augustine's	Edward the Confessor
1051		907	A.D. 1042 x 1066		Ely Abbey	Grant of land at Lakenheath and confirmation of privileges and of land at Ely, Swaffham Prior, Horningsea, Wood Ditton, Hauxton, Newton, Stapleford, Great Shelford, Triplow, Melbourn, Armingford, Little Gransden, Stetchworth, Balsham, Fulbourn, Teversham, Westley Waterless, Trumpington, West Wratting, Snailwell, Fen Ditton, Hardwick, Milton, Impington, Cottenham, and Willingham, Cambridgeshire; at Hartest, Glemsford, Hitcham, Rattlesden, Drinkstone, Nedging, Barking, Barham, Wetheringsett, Livermere, Occold, Wicklow, Sudbourne, Melton, Kingston, Hoo, Stoke (near Ipswich), Debenham, Brightwell, Woodbridge and Brandon, Suffolk; at Feltwell, Bridgeham, Methwold, Croxton, Weeting, Mundford, Bergh Apton, Westfield, Fincham, Northwold, Walpole, Marham, Dereham, Thorpe and Pulham, Norfolk; at Hadstock, Littlebury, Stretley (Green) in Littlebury, the two Rodings, Rettendon, Amberden (Hall) in Debden, Broxted, Easter, Fambridge and Terling, Essex; at Hadham, Hatfield and Kelshall, Hertfordshire; at Spaldwick, Somersham, Colne and Bluntisham, Huntingdonshire	Latin, Ely	Edward the Confessor
1052		911	A.D. 1042 x 1066		Evesham Abbey	Confirmation of privileges and of 5 hides at Hampton, Worcestershire, granted by Leofric, comes.	Latin, Evesham	Edward the Confessor
1053			A.D. 1042 x 1046		Evesham Abbey	Confirmation of the grant by Leofric, dux, of land at Hampton, Worcestershire	Latin, Evesham	Edward the Confessor
1054		890	A.D. 1042 x 1047			King Edward declares that the land at Steyning, Somerset, is to pass to Fécamp Abbey after the death of Bishop Ælfwine.	English, Fécamp	Edward the Confessor
1055		785	A.D. 1044 x 1047		the church of St Benedict (of Holme)	Confirmation of land at Horning, Neatishead, Hoveton, Belaugh, South Walsham, Worstead, Honing, Thurgarton, Thwaite, Calthorpe, Tottington, Erpingham, Antingham, North Walsham, Swanton Abbot, Scotton, Lamas, Easton, Hautbois, Ludham, Beeston St Lawrence, Stalham, Waxham, Winterton, Somerton, Thurn, Ashby, Rollesby, Caister-by-Yarmouth, Reedham, Norton Subcourse, Woodbastwick, Ranworth, Shotesham, Grenvills in Stoke Holy Cross, Tibenham, Norfolk.	Latin with English, St Benedict of Holme	Edward the Confessor
1056		913	A.D. 1042 x 1066		St Paul's Minster, London	Confirmation of privileges and of 8 hides (mansae) at Barling and 5 at Chingford, Essex.	Latin, London, St Paul's	Edward the Confessor
1057		912	A.D. 1044 x 1059			King Edward declares that Abbot Mannig and the monk Æthelwig have bought land at Evenlode, Gloucestershire, from Eammer.	Latin, Evesham	Edward the Confessor
1058		797	A.D. 1044 x 1051		Osferth	Grant of 5 hides (cassati) at Lench, Worcestershire With note, in English, of a lease, for three lives, by Bishop Lyfing to Osferth.	Latin with English, Evesham	Edward the Confessor
1059		819	A.D. 1061 x 1066		Peterborough Abbey	Confirmation of an agreement concerning land at Scotton, Scotter and Manton, Lincolnshire, acquired by the monk Brand and leased by him to his brother Askytel, with reversion after his death to Peterborough Abbey (when an estate at Northorpe, Lincolnshire, is to be substituted for Manton).	Latin, Peterborough	Edward the Confessor
1060		806	A.D. 1055 x 1060		Peterborough Abbey	Confirmation of land at Walcot on Trent, near Alkborough, Lincolnshire, given to the abbey by Asytel, the king's optimas.	Latin, Peterborough	Edward the Confessor
1061		914	A.D. 1027 x 1035		St Michael's Abbey (Mont Saint-Michel)	Grant of land at St Michael's Mount, Cornwall; and at Vennesire (? Winnianton Hundred, Cornwall) and the harbour called Ruminella (? Old Romney, Kent).	Latin, Mont Saint-Michel	Edward the Confessor
1062			A.D. 1042 x 1065			King Edward confirms a grant by Ælfgifu Emma, his mother, to Old Minster, Winchester, of land at Wargrave, Berkshire	English, Winchester, Old Minster	Edward the Confessor
1063		871	A.D. 1053 x 1058			Writ of King Edward; declaring that his housecarl Urk is to have his shore over against his land and everything driven to his shore.	English, Abbotsbury	Edward the Confessor
1064		841	A.D. 1058 x 1066			Writ of King Edward; declaring that Tole, Urk's widow, has his full permission to bequeath her lands and possessions to St Peter's, Abbotsbury.	English, Abbotsbury	Edward the Confessor
1065		888	A.D. 1052 x 1066			Writ of King Edward; declaring that he has granted to Abbot Ordric for St Mary's minster at Abingdon judicial and financial rights over his own land.	English and Latin versions, Abingdon	Edward the Confessor
1066		840	A.D. 1053 x 1055 or 1058 x 1066			Writ of King Edward; declaring that Abbot Ordric and all the community of Abingdon minster are to possess the hundred of Hormer, Berkshire, in perpetuity.	English and Latin versions, Abingdon	Edward the Confessor
1067		1343	A.D. 1060 x 1065			Writ of King Edward; declaring that Archbishop Ealdred has his permission to draw up a privilegium for all the lands pertaining to St John's minster at Beverley; and that the minster and its property shall be as free as any other minster, etcirca English and Latin versions.	English and Latin versions, Beverley	Edward the Confessor
1068		868	A.D. 1042 x 1043			Writ of King Edward; declaring that Abbot Ufi is to be entitled to the monastery at Bury St Edmunds and to everything pertaining thereto, and that the monastery is to retain unaltered the freedom granted to it by Cnut and Harthacnut.	English and Latin versions, Bury St Edmunds	Edward the Confessor
1069		832	A.D. 1043 x 1044			Writ of King Edward; declaring that the land at Mildenhall, Suffolk, and the sokes of the eight and a half Thingoe hundreds are to belong to St Edmunds as fully and completely as his mother (Queen Ælfgifu) possessed them.	English, Bury St Edmunds	Edward the Confessor
1070		1342	No date.			Writ of King Edward; declaring that the sokes of the eight and half Thingoe hundreds are to belong to St Edmunds.	English, Bury St Edmunds	Edward the Confessor
1071		894	A.D. 1044 x 1065 (? 1044)			Writ of King Edward; declaring that Abbot Leofstan and the brethren in Bury St Edmunds are to have sake and soke over all their own men both within borough and without.	English, Bury St Edmunds	Edward the Confessor
1072		892	A.D. 1044 x 1065			Writ of King Edward; declaring that Abbot Leofstan and the brethren are to have sake and soke over the lands bequeathed to them as fully and completely as this right was enjoyed by the previous owner.	English and Latin versions, Bury St Edmunds	Edward the Confessor
1073		852	A.D. 1044 x 1047			Writ of King Edward; declaring that all things lawfully pertaining to the property of St Edmund are to be the uncontested possession of that house.	English, Bury St Edmunds	Edward the Confessor
1074		851	A.D. 1044 x 1047			Writ of King Edward; announcing that he has granted the land at Pakenham, Suffolk, to St Edmund as fully and completely as Osgot had it.	English, Bury St Edmunds	Edward the Confessor
1075		879	circa A.D. 1051			Writ of King Edward; declaring that St Edmunds inland is to be exempt from payment of heregeld and from every other render.	English, Bury St Edmunds	Edward the Confessor
1076		876	A.D. 1051 x 1052			Writ of King Edward; declaring that his mother (Queen Ælfgifu) is to have the estate at Kirby Cane, Norfolk, as fully and completely as ever her retainer Leofstan had it.	English, Bury St Edmunds	Edward the Confessor
1077		878	Probably A.D. 1052			Writ of King Edward; declaring that the monastery of St Edmunds is to possess Kirby Cane, Norfolk, with all the rights of the former owners. The land is illegally occupied by Semer.	English, Bury St Edmunds	Edward the Confessor
1078		905	A.D. 1052 or 1053 x 1057			Writ of King Edward; declaring that the monastery at Bury St Edmunds is to possess the sokes of the eight and a half hundreds which he has given to that house, as fully and completely as ever his mother (Queen Ælfgifu) had them, and he himself possessed them.	English and Latin versions, Bury St Edmunds	Edward the Confessor
1079		884	A.D. 1051 x 1052 or 1053 x 1057			Writ of King Edward; declaring that the soke previously granted by him to St Edmunds is now to belong to that house as fully and completely as he himself possessed it.	English, Bury St Edmunds	Edward the Confessor
1080		880	A.D. 1051 x 1052 or 1053 x 1057			Writ of King Edward; declaring that the land at Coney Weston, Suffolk, is to belong to St Edmunds monastery with everything which is known to pertain lawfully to that house.	English, Bury St Edmunds	Edward the Confessor
1081		877	A.D. 1051 x 1052 or 1053 x 1057			Writ of King Edward; declaring that Ælfric Modercope has his full permission to commend himself to the abbots of Bury and of Ely.	English, Bury St Edmunds	Edward the Confessor
1082		882	A.D. 1051 x 1052 or 1053 x 1057			Writ of King Edward; testifying to Ælfric Modercope's grant of Loddon, Norfolk, after his death to the monastery at Bury St Edmunds.	English, Bury St Edmunds	Edward the Confessor
1083		881	A.D. 1065 x 1066			Writ of King Edward; announcing the appointment of Baldwin as abbot of Bury.	English, Bury St Edmunds	Edward the Confessor
1084		874	A.D. 1065 x 1066			Writ of King Edward; confirming to the monastery at Bury St Edmunds the sokes of the eight and a half hundreds (after the appointment of Baldwin as abbot of Bury).	English, Bury St Edmunds	Edward the Confessor
1085		875	A.D. 1065 x 1066			Writ of King Edward; declaring that he has granted to Abbot Baldwin a moneyer within Bury St Edmunds.	English, Bury St Edmunds	Edward the Confessor
1086			A.D. 1042 x 1044 or 1048 x 1050			Writ of King Edward; declaring that he has granted to Archbishop Eadsige and the monks of Christ Church all the lands they had in the time of the king's father and of all his predecessors.	Latin, Canterbury, Christ Church	Edward the Confessor
1087			A.D. 1042 x 1044 or 1048 x 1050			Writ of King Edward; forbidding hunting in the woods or lands of Archbishop Eadsige except by the archbishop's command or licence.	Latin, Canterbury, Christ Church	Edward the Confessor
1088			A.D. 1052 x 1066			Writ of King Edward; declaring that he has granted to Archbishop Stigand and the community at Christ Church judicial and financial rights over their own men and over as many thegns as he has granted them to have.	English, Canterbury, Christ Church	Edward the Confessor
1089		909	A.D. 1052 x 1066			Writ of King Edward; declaring that he has granted to Archbishop Stigand and the community at Christ Church all the lands that they had in the time of his predecessors and in his own time.	English and Latin versions, Canterbury, Christ Church	Edward the Confessor
1090		847	A.D. 1053 x 1061			Writ of King Edward; declaring that the land at Mersham, Kent, is to belong to Christ Church with sake and soke, as fully and completely as Sigweard and his wife granted it to that house.	English and Latin versions, Canterbury, Christ Church	Edward the Confessor
1091		902	A.D. 1042 x 1050			Writ of King Edward; declaring that he has granted to the brethren of St Augustine's (Canterbury) judicial and financial rights over their own men, and over as many thegns as he has granted them to have.	English and Latin versions, Canterbury, St Augustine's	Edward the Confessor
1092		854	A.D. 1053 x 1066			Writ of King Edward; declaring that the land at Fordwich, Kent, previously granted by him to St Augustine's, is now to belong to the monastery with all the rights with which he has granted it to that house.	English, Canterbury, St Augustine's	Edward the Confessor
1093		848	A.D. 1053 x 1066			Writ of King Edward; declaring that he has granted to Chertsey Abbey, Chertsey, Egham, Thorpe and Chobham, Surrey, with judicial and financial rights.	English, Chertsey	Edward the Confessor
1094		850	A.D. 1053 x 1066			Writ of King Edward; declaring that he has granted to Chertsey Abbey, Chertsey, Egham, Thorpe and Chobham, with the hundred of Godley, Surrey, with judicial and financial rights.	English, Chertsey	Edward the Confessor
1095		849	A.D. 1058 x 1066			Writ of King Edward; declaring that he has granted to Chertsey Abbey and to Abbot Wulfwold the hundred of Godley, Surrey, and that the abbot is to have judicial and financial rights over all his men and over his lands.	English, Chertsey	Edward the Confessor
1096		856	A.D. 1058 x 1066			Writ of King Edward; declaring that he has granted to Wulfwold, abbot of Chertsey, sake and soke over his lands in London and over his own men.	English, Chertsey	Edward the Confessor
1097			A.D. 1042 x 1066			Writ of King Edward; declaring that Regenbald his priest is to have judicial and financial rights over his land and over his men, as fully and completely as any of his predecessors in the days of King Cnut.	English, Cirencester	Edward the Confessor
1098			No date.			Writ of King Edward; declaring that he confirms the gifts made by Earl Leofric and Godgifu (Godiva) to Abbot Leofwine and the brethren at Coventry minster.	English and Latin versions, Coventry	Edward the Confessor
1099			A.D. 1043 x 1053			Writ of King Edward; declaring that Abbot Leofwine of Coventry is to have judicial and financial rights over the land and over his men, as fully and completely as Earl Leofric had.	English and Latin versions, Coventry	Edward the Confessor
1100		885	A.D. 1045 x 1066, possibly 1055 x 1066			Writs of King Edward; announcing that he has appointed Wulfric to the office of abbot of Ely with full privileges.	English and Latin versions, Ely	Edward the Confessor
1101		867	A.D. 1057 x 1060			Writ of King Edward; declaring that the priests of St Æthelberht's, Hereford, are to have their sake and soke over all their men and all their lands as fully and completely as ever they had it.	Latin and English versions, Hereford	Edward the Confessor
1102		833	A.D. 1061 x 1066, probably 1061			Writ of King Edward; declaring that he has granted to Bishop Walter the bishopric of Hereford.	Latin, Hereford	Edward the Confessor
1103			A.D. 1042 x 1044			Writ of King Edward; declaring that his men in the gild of English cnihtas are to have their sake and soke within borough and without over their land and over their men, and as good laws as they had in the days of King Edgar and of the king's father and of Cnut.	English, London, the English Cnihtengild	Edward the Confessor
1104		887	A.D. 1042 x 1066			Writ of King Edward; declaring that his priests in St Pauls's minster shall be entitled to sake and soke within borough and without, and to as good laws as they ever had in the time of any king or any bishop; and they shall not receive into their community any more priests than their estates can bear and they themselves desire.	English, London, St Paul's	Edward the Confessor
1105			A.D. 1053 x 1057			Writ of King Edward; declaring that he has granted to the monastery of Saint-Denis beyond the sea land at Taynton, Oxfordshire, and the bishop (of Dorchester) is to draw up a charter (boc) concerning it with his full permission.	English, Paris, Saint-Denis	Edward the Confessor
1106		906	A.D. 1043 x 1049			Writ of King Edward; declaring that St Benedict of Ramsey is to have the land at Hemingford, Hunts,, with everything pertaining thereto as fully and completely as King Harthacnut and Queen Ælfgifu Emma granted it to that church.	Latin, Ramsey	Edward the Confessor
1107		903	A.D. 1050 x 1052			Writ of King Edward; declaring that he has given to Ramsey Abbey the land at Broughton, Huntingdonshire, which he himself possessed, with sake and soke.	Latin, Ramsey	Edward the Confessor
1108			A.D. 1053 x 1057			Writ of King Edward; declaring that the soke within Bichamdic (cf. Beechamwell, Norfolk) is to belong to Ramsey Abbey as fully and completely as it was first given to that church.	Latin, Ramsey	Edward the Confessor
1109		853	No date.			Writ of King Edward; declaring that he has granted to Ramsey Abbey judicial and financial rights and shipwreck and what is cast up by the sea at Brancaster and Ringstead, the soke within Bichamdic (cf. S 1108), the market at Downham, Norfolk, and judicial and financial rights in every shire in which St Benedict of Ramsey has land.	English and Latin versions, Ramsey	Edward the Confessor
1110		904	No date.			Writ of King Edward; declaring that he has confirmed the exchange of land at Luton, Northamptonshire, for land at Marholm, Northamptonshire, and the agreement made between Ælfwine, abbot of Ramsey, and Leofric, abbot of Peterborough; and has also confirmed the boundaries along King Cnut's Delph, Northamptonshire, as Ælfwine, abbot of Ramsey, proved his claim to them against Siward, abbot of Thorney.	English and Latin versions, Ramsey	Edward the Confessor
1111		835	A.D. 1060 x 1061 (? 1061)			Writ of King Edward; declaring that he has granted to his priest Giso the bishopric at Wells and everything pertaining thereto, with sake and with soke, as fully and completely as ever it was held by Bishop Duduc or any bishop before him.	English and Latin versions, Wells	Edward the Confessor
1112		838	A.D. 1061 x 1065 (? 1061)			Writ of King Edward; declaring that Bishop Giso is to have the bishopric of Wells and everything lawfully belonging thereto as fully and completely as any of his predecessors.	English and Latin versions, Wells	Edward the Confessor
1113		836	A.D. 1061 x 1066			Writ of King Edward; declaring that Bishop Giso is to discharge the obligations on his land at Chew, Somerset, now at the same rate as his predecessor had done.	English and Latin versions, Wells	Edward the Confessor
1114		834	No date.			Writ of King Edward; declaring that Bishop Giso is to discharge the obligations on his land now at the same rate as his predecessor had done.	English, Wells	Edward the Confessor
1115		837	A.D. 1061 x 1065			Writ of King Edward; declaring that he has given to Bishop Giso for the maintenance of his canons at St Andrew's, Wells, land at Wedmore, Somerset, and the bishop is to draw up a privilegium concerning this.	English and Latin versions, Wells	Edward the Confessor
1116		839	A.D. 1061 x 1065			Writ of King Edward; declaring that Alfred has sold to Bishop Giso his land at Litton, Somerset.	English and Latin versions, Wells	Edward the Confessor
1117		870	A.D. 1042 x 1044			Writ of King Edward; declaring that the burh at Wennington, Essex, with the 4 hides belonging to it and the church and land æt thære lea, is to belong to Westminster Abbey as fully and completely as ever Ætsere Swearte and his wife Ælfgyth owned them and gave them to the abbey with his consent.	English, Westminster	Edward the Confessor
1118		869	No date.			Writ of King Edward; declaring that the land at Kelvedon Hatch, Essex, is to belong to Westminster Abbey as fully and as completely as ever Æthelric the chamberlain and his wife Gode owned it and bequeathed it to the abbey with his consent.	English, Westminster	Edward the Confessor
1119		872	A.D. 1042 x 1044			Writ of King Edward; declaring that the monks of Westminster are to have the land and wharf which Ulf the portreeve and his wife Cynegyth gave to Westminster Abbey, as fully and completely as ever the donors possessed it.	English, Westminster	Edward the Confessor
1120		828	No date.			Writ of King Edward; declaring that the estate of Lessness, Kent, which Ætsere owned and bequeathed to Westminster Abbey for the monks' food is now to belong to the abbey.	English, Westminster	Edward the Confessor
1121		843	A.D. 1044 x 1051			Writ of King Edward; declaring that the monks of Westminster Abbey are to have the land at Chalkhill, Middlesex, given by Thurstan, his housecarl.	English, Westminster	Edward the Confessor
1122		827	A.D. 1045 x 1049			Writ of King Edward; declaring that he has given to Westminster Abbey the land at Aldenham, Hertfordshire, as fully and completely as Earl Sihtric held it of the monastery and committed it to Abbot Ælfric and the community, and as Abbot Ordbriht held it for the monastery in the days of King Offa and King Cenwulf, and as King Edgar in his charter confirmed it to the abbey.	English, Westminster	Edward the Confessor
1123		826	A.D. 1049			Writ of King Edward; declaring that he has given to Westminster Abbey the estates of Datchworth and Watton-at-Stone, Hertfordshire, as fully and completely as Ælfwynn the nun held them of the monastery and committed them to Abbot Edwin and the monks, and as King Edgar granted them to the monastery, and as they were adjudged in (the assembly of) the nine shires at Wendlebury (? Wandlebury, Cambridgeshire).	English, Westminster	Edward the Confessor
1124		873	A.D. 1047 x 1065			Writ of King Edward; declaring that he intends to have legal possession of the land at Ickworth, Suffolk (which he possesses for Westminster Abbey), and that it is to be transferred to him as soon as the present writ is read.	English, Westminster	Edward the Confessor
1125			A.D. 1049 x 1066			Writ of King Edward; declaring that he has given to Abbot Edwin judicial and financial rights as fully and completely as he himself possessed them.	English, Westminster	Edward the Confessor
1126		889	A.D. 1042 x 1066			Writ of King Edward; declaring that he has given to St Peter of Westminster on all his land judicial and financial rights as fully and completely as ever he himself possessed them.	English, Westminster	Edward the Confessor
1127			A.D. 1042 x 1066			Writ of King Edward; declaring that he has given to St Peter of Westminster judicial and financial rights as fully and as completely as he himself possessed them.	English, Westminster	Edward the Confessor
1128		859	A.D. 1052 x 1053			Writ of King Edward; declaring that the estate at Moulsham, Essex, which Leofcild owned and bequeathed to Westminster Abbey, is now to belong to the abbey just as he granted it.	English, Westminster	Edward the Confessor
1129		845	A.D. 1053 x 1066			Writ of King Edward; declaring that the monks of Westminster are to have the estate of Eversley, Hampshire Four free sokemen who hold the estate are henceforth to be subject to Westminster Abbey.	English, Westminster	Edward the Confessor
1130		858	A.D. 1051 x 1066, probably 1057 x 1066			Writ of King Edward; declaring that he has given to Westminster Abbey the land at Shepperton, Middlesex, as fully and completely as St Dunstan bought it and granted it by charter to the abbey (cf. S 1293).	English, Westminster	Edward the Confessor
1131			A.D. 1049 x 1066, probably 1057 x 1066			Writ of King Edward; declaring that he has given to Teinfrith, his 'churchwright', the land at Shepperton, Middlesex, with judicial and financial rights and exemptions.	English, Westminster	Edward the Confessor
1132		860	A.D. 1051 x 1066, probably 1057 x 1066			Writ of King Edward; declaring that with his full permission Ailric has granted the land at Greenford, Middlesex, to Westminster Abbey in accordance with the agreement that the brethren and he have made.	English, Westminster	Edward the Confessor
1133			A.D. 1051 x 1066, perhaps 1057 x 1066			Writ of King Edward; declaring that with his full permission Ailric has granted land at Greenford, Middlesex, to Westminster Abbey in accordance with the agreement that the brethren and he have made; and he grants them judicial and financial rights.	English, Westminster	Edward the Confessor
1134		866	A.D. 1053 x 1066, probably 1057 x 1066			Writ of King Edward; declaring that Leofsi Duddessunu has given land at Wormley, Hertfordshire, to Westminster Abbey with his permission.	English, Westminster	Edward the Confessor
1135		864	A.D. 1053 x 1066, probably 1057 x 1066			Writ of King Edward; declaring that the monks of Westminster are to have the estate at Ayot (St Lawrence), Hertfordshire, given by Ælfwine Gottone and his wife.	English, Westminster	Edward the Confessor
1136		846	A.D. 1057 x 1066			Writ of King Edward; declaring that the monks of Westminster Abbey are to have the land at Tooting, Surrey, given by Swegen his kinsman.	English, Westminster	Edward the Confessor
1137			A.D. 1058 x 1066			Writ of King Edward; declaring that the piece of land at Claygate, Surrey, given by Earl Tostig and his wife Leofrun, the king's foster-mother, is to belong to Westminster Abbey.	English, Westminster	Edward the Confessor
1138		863	A.D. 1053 x 1066			Writ of King Edward; declaring that he has given Rutland to Westminster Abbey and Queen Edith is to have it for her lifetime.	English, Westminster	Edward the Confessor
1139		865	A.D. 1065 x 1066			Writ of King Edward; declaring that he has given land at Launton, Oxfordshire, to Westminster Abbey.	English, Westminster	Edward the Confessor
1140		842	A.D. 1062 x 1066			Writ of King Edward; declaring that he has granted to Westminster Abbey the land at Perton, Staffordshire, as fully and completely as he himself held it.	English, Westminster	Edward the Confessor
1141		886	A.D. 1042 x 1066			Writ of King Edward; declaring that he has given to Westminster Abbey, Windsor, Berkshire, and Staines, Middlesex	English, Westminster	Edward the Confessor
1142		855	A.D. 1053 x 1066			Writ of King Edward; declaring that the monks of Westminster Abbey are to have the estate of Staines, Middlesex, with the land in London called Stæningahaga and the soke of 35 hides, with berewicks.	English, Westminster	Edward the Confessor
1143			A.D. 1042 x 1066			Writ of King Edward; declaring that he has granted to Westminster Abbey, Pershore, Worcestershire, and Deerhurst, Gloucestershire	English, Westminster	Edward the Confessor
1144		830	A.D. 1042 x 1066			Writ of King Edward; declaring that he has given to Westminster Abbey, Pershore, Worcestershire, and Deerhurst, Gloucestershire, and commands that all the thegns of the lands be henceforth subject to the abbot and monks.	English, Westminster	Edward the Confessor
1145			A.D. 1042 x 1066			Writ of King Edward; declaring that he has granted to Westminster Abbey, Pershore, Worcestershire, and Deerhurst, Gloucestershire, and invokes a blessing on every man who shall be loyal to the holy monastery.	English, Westminster	Edward the Confessor
1146		829	A.D. 1062 x 1066			Writ of King Edward; declaring that the monks of Westminster Abbey are to have the estates of Pershore, Worcestershire, and Deerhurst, Gloucestershire, with all the land and berewicks which he has granted to the abbey.	English, Westminster	Edward the Confessor
1147			A.D. 1065 x 1066			Writ of King Edward; declaring that he has given to Westminster Abbey, Islip and land at Marston, Oxfordshire	English, Westminster	Edward the Confessor
1148		862	A.D. 1065 x 1066			Writ of King Edward; declaring that he has given to Westminster Abbey the estate at Islip where he was born and a half hide at Marston, Oxfordshire He directs his kinsman Wigod of Wallingford to transfer the land to the abbey on his behalf.	English, Westminster	Edward the Confessor
1149		861	A.D. 1051 x 1066			Writ of King Edward; declaring to the authorities of London that he has granted to St Peter of Westminster full freedom upon all the lands belonging to the abbey with judicial and financial rights as fully and completely as he himself possessed them.	English, Westminster	Edward the Confessor
1150		857	A.D. 1065 x 1066			Writ of King Edward; declaring that he has granted to St Peter of Westminster at the dedication of the church full freedom upon all the lands belonging to the abbey with judicial and financial rights as fully and completely as he himself possessed them.	English, Westminster	Edward the Confessor
1151			A.D. 1042 x 1047			Writ of King Edward; declaring that he has granted to Bishop Ælfwine the bishopric of Winchester as fully and completely as ever King Cnut granted it to him, that is, with judicial and financial rights.	English, Winchester, Old Minster	Edward the Confessor
1152			A.D. 1042 x 1047			Writ of King Edward; declaring that he has granted to Bishop Ælfwine the bishopric of Winchester as fully and completely as ever King Cnut granted it to him, and grants to Old Minster and to the bishop judicial and financial rights.	English, Winchester, Old Minster	Edward the Confessor
1153			A.D. 1052 x 1053			Writ of King Edward; declaring that he has confirmed his mother's bequest to the monks of Old Minster of a messuage (haga) called Ælfrices Godebegeaton in Winchester, which she held by the gift of King Æthelred (cf. S 925), and of 10 hides on Hayling Island, Hampshire	English, Winchester, Old Minster	Edward the Confessor
1154		891	A.D. 1053 x 1066			Writ of King Edward; declaring that he has bequeathed Portland, Dorset, and everything belonging thereto to the Old Minster at Winchester.	English, Winchester, Old Minster	Edward the Confessor
1155			No date.			Writ of King Edward; declaring that he has granted privileges to his priests at Wolverhampton.	English, Wolverhampton	Edward the Confessor
1156			A.D. 1062			Writ of King Edward; declaring that he has granted to the monk Wulfstan the bishopric of Worcester.	English, Worcester	Edward the Confessor
1157			Probably A.D. 1062			Writ of King Edward; declaring that he has granted to the monk Ælfstan judicial and financial rights over his land and over his men.	English, Worcester	Edward the Confessor
1158			Probably A.D. 1062			Writ of King Edward; declaring that he has granted to Bishop Wulfstan for St Mary's minster the third part of the seamtoll and of the ceaptoll as fully and as completely as he has (? had) the other thing.	English, Worcester	Edward the Confessor
1159		893	A.D. 1060 x 1066			Writ of King Edward; declaring that he had granted to Archbishop Ealdred judicial and financial rights over his lands and all his men.	English, York	Edward the Confessor
1160			A.D. 1060 x 1065			Writ of King Edward; declaring that he has granted to Archbishop Ealdred judicial and financial rights over his men within the king's own soke as fully and as completely as the archbishop has them in his own lands.	Latin, York	Edward the Confessor
1161			A.D. 1060 x 1066			Writ of King Edward; announcing that he has granted to Ealdred, the 'deacon' of Archbishop Ealdred, the minster at Axminster, Devon, as a pious benefaction for St Peter's minster at York.	English, York	Edward the Confessor
1162			A.D. 1060 x 1061			Writ of King Edward; declaring that he has granted to his clerks at Bromfield, Shropshire., judicial and financial rights over their lands.	English, Hereford	Edward the Confessor
1163		976	A.D. 1066			Writ of King Harold; declaring that Bishop Giso is to have judicial and financial rights as fully and completely as ever he did in King Edward's time.	English and Latin versions, Wells	Harold
1164	107		A.D. 670 x 676		Bectun, abbot	Grant of 30 hides (manentes) by Fontmell Brook, Dorset.	Latin with bounds, Shaftesbury	
1165	34		A.D. 672 x 674 (Fullingadich, 1 March)	Frithuwold, subregulus of Surrey	Eorcenwold and to St Peter's minster, Chertsey	Grant of 200 (or 300) hides (manentes) at Chertsey and 5 at Thorpe, with 10 hides by the port of London. The property comprises land at Chertsey, Thorpe, Egham, Getinges (cf. Eaton Farm, Chobham), Molesey, Woodham in Chertsey and Hunewaldesham (lost) in Weybridge, Surrey. Confirmed by Wulfhere, king of the Mercians, in the royal vill at Thame, Oxfordshire	Latin with English bounds appended, Chertsey	
1166	54		A.D. 680	Cenfrith, comes Merciorum	Aldhelm, abbot	Grant of 10 hides (cassati) at Wootton Bassett, Wiltshire	Latin, Malmesbury	
1167	57		A.D. 680 (October)		Bernguidis (Beorngyth), abbess, and to Folcburh, and their monastery	Grant of 20 hides (manentes) by the river Cherwell.	Latin, Bath	
1168	28		A.D. 670 x 671 [? AD 681] (October)		Abbes Bernguidis (Beorngyth)	Grant of 40 hides (manentes) at Slæpi (Islip, Oxon).	Latin, Bath	
1169	65		A.D. 685 (iuxta vadum Berlingford, ? Burford, Oxon, 30 July)	Berhtwald, king or subregulus	Aldhelm, abbot, for the monks of Malmesbury	Grant of 40 hides (cassati) at Somerford Keynes, Gloucestershire	Latin, Malmesbury	
1170	71		A.D. 688 (August)		Aldhelm, abbot	Grant of 100 hides (manentes) near the river Avon, round the wood called Stercanlei (cf. Startley Farm in Great Somerford, Wiltshire) and at Cnebbanburg, in exchange for 100 hides (cassati) east of the wood called Braydon, Wiltshire	Latin, Malmesbury	
1171	81		A.D. 685 x 693, probably 686 x 688 (March)		Hedilburg (Æthelburh), abbess, for her minster called Beddanhaam (Barking)	Grant of 40 hides (manentes) at Ricingahaam, Budinhaam, Dagenham, Angenlabeshaam and Widmundes felt (Wyfields in Great Ilford), all probably in Essex.	Latin with bounds, Barking	
1172	79		A.D. 692 x 709		Wilfrid, bishop	Grant of land at Lidsey, Aldingbourne, Genestedegate (cf. Westergate) and Mundham, Sussex, which she had been given by her brother Nothhelm (cf. S 45). With later confirmations by Offa and Ceolwulf I, kings of Mercia, and Æthelwulf, king of Wessex.	Latin, Selsey	
1173	80		circa A.D. 700	Bruny (Bryni), dux of Sussex	Eadberht, abbot	Grant of 4 hides (manentes) Hileigh, Sussex.	Latin, Selsey	
1174	117		A.D. 706	Æthelric, son of King Oshere, with the consent of Cenred. king of the Mercians	St Mary's at Hom (Evesham)	Grant of 8 hides (manentes) at Childswickham, Worcestershire	Latin with English bounds, Evesham	
1175	118		A.D. 706	Walter, sacerdos	St Mary's minster, Cronochomme (Evesham) and to Ecgwine, bishop	Grant of land at Swell, Gloucestershire	Latin, Evesham	
1176			A.D. 708		Froda, abbot	Grant of fishery called Swynwere in the river Parret, Somerset.	Latin, Muchelney	
1177	122		A.D. 704 x 709		Cuthswith	Grant of 5 hides (manentes) at Ingon, Warwickshire, in return for 600 shillings.	Latin, Worcester	
1178	261		A.D. 711 ? for 791 (Biohchandoune, Sussex)	Ealdwulf, dux of the South Saxons, with the consent of Offa, king of the English	Wihthun, bishop, for St Andrew's church, Ferring	Grant of woodland at Cealtborgsteal.	Latin with bounds, Selsey	
1179	29		A.D. 705 x 726		Cille, his sister	Grant for life of 48 hides (cassati) at Bradfield, 55 at Escesdun (i.e. the Berkshirehire Downs) and 73 at Earmundeslea (cf. Bessels Leigh), Berkshire, with reversion to himself or the minster (probably at Bradfield).	Latin, Abingdon (? ex Bradfield minster)	
1180	141		A.D. 724 (11 July)	Æthelberht, son of King Wihtred	Mildred, abbess, and her familia	Grant of 1 sulung (aratrum) by the river Limen and meadow at Hammespot (in Romney Marsh), Kent.	Latin with English, Canterbury, St Augustine's (ex Minster-in-Thanet)	
1181	39		A.D. 727	Frithuwold, subregulus of Surrey, and Eorcenwold	Chertsey Minster	Grant of 20 hides (mansae) at Molesey, 10 at Petersham, 7 at Tooting with Streatham, 7 at Mitcham, 30 at Sutton, 10 at Carshalton (Æuueltone), 20 at Beddington, 7 at Waddington, 20 at Coulsdon, 20 at Merstham, 5 at Chipstead with Chaldon, 10 at Banstead with Suthemeresfelda (Canon's Farm in Banstead), 5 at Tadworth, 20 at Epsom, 30 at Ewell with Cuddington, 20 at Cheam with swine-pasture in the Weald, 20 at Bookham with Effingham, 20 at Cobham with Pointers, 5 at Esher, 5 at Apps Court, 10 and 2 at East and West Clandon, 2 at Albury, 4 at Compton, 5 at Henley Park, Surrey; 30 at Winchfield with Elvetham, Hampshire; 8 at Byfleet with Weybridge, Surrey; and 10 at White Waltham, Berkshire	Latin, Chertsey	
1182	192		A.D. 762	Dunwald, minister of the late King Æthelberht	the church of SS Peter and Paul (St Augustine's), Canterbury	Grant of land in Canterbury.	Latin with bounds, Canterbury, St Augustine's	
1183	262		A.D. (circa 771 x 780) x 786	Aldwulf, dux of the South Saxons, with the consent of Offa, king of Mercia	the church of St Peter, Selsey	Grant of 3 hides (tributarii) at Peartingawyrth and Wealingawyrth; with confirmation by King Offa.	Latin, Selsey	
1184	237		A.D. 780 (Selsey)	Oslac, dux of the South Saxons	the church of St Paul	Grant of land at Earnley, Sussex, and Tielæsora; with confirmation by Offa, king of Mercia, A.D. 787 x 796.	Latin, Selsey	
1185	1007		? A.D. 781 x 796	Wiferd and Alta, his wife	the church of St Peter, Worcester	Grant of 15 hides (cassati) at Knighton-on-Teme, Newnham and Eardiston in Lindridge, Worcestershire	Latin with English bounds, Worcester	
1186	252		A.D. 795	Berhtwald, dux	the Abbey of St Denis	Grant of land at Rotherfield, Hastings and Pevensey, Sussex.	Latin, Paris, Saint-Denis	
1186a			A.D. 799 x 801			Pilheard, comes of Coenwulf, king of Mercia, declares that he has obtained immunities for his 30-hide estate in Middlesex, in return for 200 solidi and an annual render of 30 solidi. The land is to be free from all public renders and burdens and from fines at folk-moots, but the landowner shall still be liable to construction of bridges and fortifications and shall owe the military service of five men.	Latin	
1187	313		A.D. 804			Æthelric, son of Æthelmund, declares his intention to bequeath land at Todenham, Gloucestershire; Sture; Shrawley, Worcestershire; and at Cohhanlea to Deerhurst; at Bromsgrove and Feckenham, Worcestershire, to Wærferth for life with reversion to Worcester; and land under Over, Gloucestershire, at Westmynster (Westbury-on-Trym) and at Stoce (Stoke Bishop, Gloucestershire or Stoke Prior, Worcestershire), to Ceolburh, his mother, for life, with reversion to the church at Worcester.	Latin, Worcester	
1188	330		A.D. 805 x 810 (or 805 x 815)	Oswulf, aldormonn, and Beornthryth, his wife	Christ Church, Canterbury	Grant of 20 sulungs at Stanhamstead (in Aldington), Kent, with confirmation by Archbishop Wulfred.	English, Canterbury, Christ Church	
1189	331		A.D. 810	Ælfgar, comes	Siward, abbot, and Crowland Abbey	Grant of land at Holbeach, Whaplode, Spalding, Pinchbeck, Algarkirk, Dowdike, Drayton and Burtoft, Lincolnshire	Latin, Crowland	
1190	365		A.D. 819	Fregist, miles	Siward, abbot, and Crowland Abbey	Grant of land at Langtoft, Lincolnshire	Latin, Crowland	
1191	383		A.D. 825	Ælfgar, miles	Siward, abbot of Crowland	Grant of land at Baston, Lincolnshire	Latin, Crowland	
1192			A.D. 829	Wulfnoth (Wlnotus), miles	St Guthlac of Crowland and his monks	Grant of land at Addington, Northamptonshire	Latin, Crowland	
1193	837		circa A.D. 848		Winemund	Grant of land at Burmarsh halfsæta, in return for 800 pence.	Latin with bounds, Canterbury, St Augustine's	
1194	448		A.D. 845 (London, 8 Nov)	Werenberht, minister and prefectus	Werheard, priest and abbot	Exchange of 1 hide (cassatus) in Roxeth, Middlesex, formerly belonging to the vill at Greenford, Middlesex, for similar land.	Latin, Canterbury, Christ Church	
1195	403		circa A.D. 850		Christ Church (Canterbury)	Grant of renders from land at Burnan and at Finglesham, Kent.	English, Canterbury, Christ Church	
1196	497		? A.D. 859			Plegred declares that he has purchased from Æthelmod, dix, a half tun which previously pertained to Wilburgewellan near Canterbury (? Well near Ickham), Kent. 2. Æthelmod grants the land to Plegred.	Latin and English with bounds, Canterbury, Christ Church	
1197	405		A.D. 843 x 863	Lufu, ancilla Dei	Christ Chuch, Canterbury	Grant of annual render from her estate at Mongeham, Kent.	English, Canterbury, Christ Church	
1198	501		circa A.D. 850		St Augustine's Abbey	Grant of renders from land at Brabourne, Kent.	English, Canterbury, St Augustine's	
1199	515		A.D. 858 x 866		Oswig and Weahtryth	Grant of land (? in Canterbury).	Latin, Canterbury, Christ Church	
1200	404		A.D. 867 x 870			Agreement concerning land at Chart, Kent.	English, Canterbury, Christ Church	
1201	522		A.D. 868	Æthelswith, queen of Mercia	Cuthwulf, minister.	Grant of 15 hides (manentes.) at Lockinge, Berkshire	Latin, Abingdon	
1202	529		A.D. 870 x 889			Alfred receives life-use of an estate at Croydon, Surrey, in return for bequeathing an estate at Chartham, Kent, to Christ Church after his death.	Old and Middle English versions, Canterbury, Christ Church	
1203	539		A.D. 875		Wighelm	Grant of 1 sulung and a 'yokelet' at Hamme (? Ham in Romney Marsh, Kent), in return for 120 mancuses of gold; with confirmation by Archbishop Plegmund, A.D. 890 x 923. The land had been given to Eardwulf by King Alfred.	Latin with bounds, Canterbury, Christ Church	
1204	519		A.D. 888 for ? 868		Eanmund	Grant of land in Canterbury, in return for 120 silver pence; with added note of a purchase by Æthelhere in A.D. 888.	Latin, Canterbury, Christ Church	
1204a			s. ix			Alfred, aldormon, and Wærburg, his wife, declare that they have ransomed holy books from the Danish army and now wish to donate them to Christ Church, Canterbury.	English	
1205	585		A.D. 901		the familia of the church of Malmesbury	Grant of 4 hides (manentes) at Chelworth near Crudwell, Wiltshire, in exchange for 5 hides at Mannington in Lydiard Tregoze, Wiltshire	Latin, Malmesbury	
1205a			? A.D. 904			Ordlaf grants four hides (cassati) at Chelworth in Crudwell, Wiltshire, to the familia at Malmesbury.	Latin	
1205b			A.D. 918 (Ghent)		St Peter's Abbey, Ghent	Grant of land at Lewisham, Greenwich and Woolwich, Kent.	Latin, Ghent, St Peter's	
1206	640		A.D. 918 x 924	Goda, optimas and minister	Wiohstan	Grant of 4 hides (cassati) at Up Marden, Sussex, with a note of Wiohstan's purchase of a further hide (manens), presumably at Marden, from Alfred and his wife Ealhswaru.	Latin, Selsey	
1207			A.D. 924 x 939	Maenchi, comes	St Heldenus	Grant of land at Lanlowren (in Lanteglos), Cornwall.	Latin, Athelney	
1208	687		circa A.D. 931	Athelstan, senator	St Mary's, Abingdon	Grant of land at Uffington, Berkshire	Latin and English versions with English bounds, Abingdon	
1209	733		A.D. 939		Wulfhelm, archbishop	Grant of land to the south of Canterbury.	Latin with bounds, Canterbury, Christ Church	
1210	747		A.D. 940	Eadulf, dux	Christ Church, Canterbury	Grant of land at Darenth and Meopham, Kent.	Latin, Canterbury, Christ Church	
1211	1064		circa A.D. 959	Eadgifu, queen	Christ Church, Canterbury	Grant of land at Cooling, and at Osterland, Kent, with an account of the history of these estates.	English, Canterbury, Christ Church	
1212	1065		A.D. 961			Latin version of S 1211 with note of grant by Eadgifu, queen, to Christ Church, Canterbury, of land at Meopham, Cooling, Lenham, Pettham (Petham or Peckham), Farleigh, Monkton, and Ealdintun, Kent; with confirmation by King Æthelred (A.D. 995 x 1005).	Latin, Canterbury, Christ Church	
1213	1084		A.D. 962		St Edmund's Abbey, Beodrichesworth	Grant of 4 hides (cassati) at Palgrave, Suffolk.	Latin, Bury St Edmunds	
1214	1092		A.D. 962	Vua (? Ufa), the Hwede, vicecomes of Warwick	Evesham Abbey	Grant of 6.5 hides at Wixford and Temple Grafton, Warwickshire	Latin, Evesham	
1215	1212		A.D. 968		Ælfwold	Grant of a swine-pasture at Heronden in Tenterden, Kent, in return for 1450 pence.	English and Latin with English bounds, Canterbury, Christ Church	
1216	1262		A.D. 971 x 980 (Alderbury, Wilts)	Ælfhere, ealdorman	Osgar, abbot	Record of the sale of 20 hides at Kingston Bagpuize, Berkshire	Latin and English versions, Abingdon	
1217		656	A.D. 987			Founds Cerne Abbey, the endowment including land at Cerne and Æscere, 6 hides (cassati) at Mintern, 10 at Winterborne Abbas, 6 and 12 at Little and Long Bredy and 3 at Renscombe [to pass to the minster after Æthelmær's death], land at Poxwell [granted by Leofric of Poxwell, clericus], and the reversion of 4 hides at Affpuddle [granted by Ælfrith of Bincombe, Æthelmær's propinquus, after the death of Leofwine] and of 5 hides (mansae) at Bloxworth [granted by Ælfwold, after the death of his wife], and tithes from Cerne and Cheselbourne, all in Dorset.	Latin, Cerne	
1218			A.D. 995 x 999		Christ Church, Canterbury	Grant of land at Bocking and Mersea, Essex.	Latin, Canterbury, Christ Church	
1218a			s. x2			Record of grant by Ælfhelm to Leofsige, his goldsmith, of land at Potton, Bedfordshire	English, Ely	
1219	1013	1349	Probably A.D. 978 x 1016		Bury St Edmunds	Grant of land at Rickinghall, Rougham, Woolpit, Hinderclay, Suffolk, and at Redfaresthorpe (? Redgrave, Suffolk).	English, Bury St Edmunds	
1220		1315	A.D. 1013 x 1020 (? 1013 x 1018)		Leofwine the Red	Grant of a swine-pasture at Swithrædingdænne (? Southernden, Kent), which Leofwine attaches to Boughton (? Malherbe), Kent.	English, Canterbury, Christ Church	
1221		742	A.D. 1026		Christ Church, Canterbury	Grant of land at Saltwood, Kent.	Latin, Canterbury, Christ Church	
1222		958	? A.D. 1036		Christ Church	Grant of land at East Horsley, Surrey.	English, Canterbury, Christ Church	
1223		938	A.D. 1033 x 1038	Leofric, comes	Evesham Abbey	Grant of land at Hampton, Worcestershire	Latin, Evesham	
1224		978	circa A.D. 1040		(Bury) St Edmunds	Grant in reversion of land at Playford, Suffolk, after the death of Ælfgar, priest.	English, Bury St Edmunds	
1225	1018		circa A.D. 1040		Bury St Edmunds	Grant of land at Culford, Wordwell and Ixworth, Suffolk.	English, Bury St Edmunds	
1226		939	A.D. 1043			Grant of land at Coventry, Honington, Kings Newnham, Chadshunt, Bishops Itchington, Ufton, Southam, Grandborough, Birdingbury, Marston in Wolston, Priors Hardwick, Wasperton, Chesterton, Snohham, Ryton, Walsgrave on Sowe, Long Marston, Warwickshire; Salwarpe, Worcestershire; Eaton, Ches.; Kilsby and Winwick, Northamptonshire; Burbage, Barwell, Scraptoft and Packington, Leicestershire	Latin, Coventry	
1227	1006		? A.D. 1046 x 1062	Wilburh, widow	Worcester minster	Grant, after her death, of 1 hide (mansa) at Shurnock in Feckenham, Worcestershire	Latin with English bounds, Worcester	
1228		962	A.D. 1042 x 1049		St Albans	Grant of 21 hides (mansae), consisting of 5 hides at Grandborough, Buckinghamshire, 7 hides and 1 gyrd at Redbourn, Hertfordshire, 5.5 hides at Langley, and 3.5 at Thwangtune (Fawn Wood in St Albans), Hertfordshire	English and Latin versions, St Albans	
1229		965	A.D. 1042 x 1052			Statement by the Lady Ælfgifu (Emma), mother of King Edward,; to the effect that she had acquired from King Cnut the estate at Newington, Oxfordshire, on behalf of Christ Church, when it was forfeited by Ælfricirca The king then granted it to the community.	English, Canterbury, Christ Church	
1230		795	A.D. 1051		Crowland Abbey	Grant of land at Spalding, Lincolnshire, for the foundation of a cell there.	Latin, Crowland	
1231		919	A.D. 1042 x 1065			Record of agreement between Eadnoth and his wife, and Abbot Ælfwine and the community of St Benedict's, Ramsey,; concerning land at Acleia. Eadnoth and his wife are to retain the land for their lifetimes, after which it will revert to Ramsey. They are to pay 2 pounds every year to their son Æthelric, a monk at Ramsey, for his clothing. Their man Leofwine is to keep his virgate until his death, when it will revert to the church.	Latin, Ramsey	
1232		766	A.D. 1052 x 1057	Leofric, comes, and his wife (Godgifu)	St Mary's, Worcester	Grant of 5 hides at Wolverley, Worcestershire, and 2 at Blackwell in Tredington, Warwickshire, and a haga in the port (? Worcester).	Latin and English versions, Worcester	
1233		818	A.D. 1054 x 1057	Godiva (Godgifu), wife of Leofric	St Mary's, Stow	Grant of land at Newark, Fledborough, Nottinghamshire; Brampton in Torksey, and Marton in Well Wapentake, Lincolnshire, with papal confirmation.	Latin, Eynsham	
1234		799	A.D. 1052 x 1070, possibly 1054 ([London])		Christ Church, Canterbury	Grant of reversion of land (at Gracechurch) with All Hallows Church, after the death of his wife, Eadgifu, and his sons, Eadmær and Æthelwine.	English, Canterbury, Christ Church	
1235		945	A.D. 1053 x 1066	Oswulf and Æthelgyth, his wife	Abbot Leofstan and St Albans Abbey	Grant of 1 pound and of land at Studham, Bedfordshire, the donors retaining a life interest, in return for admission into confraternity with the abbey.	English and Latin versions, St Albans	
1236		926	A.D. 1057 x 1065	Gytha, comitissa	St Olave (Exeter)	Grant of land at Sherford, Devon.	Latin, Exeter, St Olave	
1237			circa A.D. 1061	Ælfgar, quondam comes	the church of St Remigius, Rheims	Grant of land at Lapley, Staffordshire	Latin, Rheims, St Remigius	
1238		963	A.D. 1061 x 1065	Ælfgar, dux	Æthelwig, abbot of Evesham	Restitution of 7 hides at Daylesford, Gloucestershire, in return for 6 marks of gold.	Latin with English bounds, Evesham	
1239			circa A.D. 850		St Augustine's, Canterbury	Grant of render from an estate at Nackington, Kent.	English, Canterbury, St Augustine's	
1240		917	A.D. 1061 x 1066			Writ of Queen Edith; declaring that Bishop Giso is to have the land at Milverton, Somerset, as fully and completely as she herself possessed it.	English and Latin versions, Wells	
1241		918	A.D. 1066 x 1075			Writ of Queen Edith,; declaring that she has given to Bishop Giso for his canons at St Andrew's, Wells, the land at Mark, Somerset. She requests a judgement on Wuduman, to whom she entrusted her horses and who has withheld rent for six years.	English and Latin versions, Wells	
1242		717	A.D. 995 x 1002			Writ of Ælfthryth (the king's mother); giving testimony concerning an estate at Ruishton, Somerset.	English, Winchester, Old Minster	
1243			Probably A.D. 1041 x 1064			Writ of Gospatric; declaring that Thorfynn mac Thore shall be free in respect of all things that are Gospatric's in Allerdale, Cumberland, and that the men dwelling with Thorfynn at Cardew and Cumdivock shall be free.	English, uncertain	
1243a			A.D. 1042 x 1066		the church of St Paul	Grant of land at Weeley, Essex.	Latin, London, St Paul's	
1244	7		A.D. 597 x 604	Augustine, bishop of Canterbury	the minster of SS Peter and Paul (St Augustine's), Canterbury	Grant of privileges.	Latin, Canterbury, St Augustine's	
1245	37		A.D. 675 (iuxta flumen Bladon, 26 Aug)	Leuthere, bishop of the Saxons	Aldhelm, priest	Grant of land at Malmesbury, Wiltshire, for a monastery.	Latin, Malmesbury	
1246	87		A.D. 677 for 687 or 688	Eorcenwold, bishop of the East Saxons	the nunnery of Barking	Grant of privileges and grant and confirmation of lands, comprising 40 hides (cassatae) at Barking and Beddanhaam (probably Barking) [given to Eorcenwald by King Suidfrid], 75 hides (manentes) at Ricingahaam, Bydinhaam, Dagenham, Angenlabeshaam and Widmundes felth (Wyfields in Great Ilford) [granted by Oedilred, cf. S 1171], and 10 hides at Childerditch [also granted by Oedilred], all in Essex; and 53 hides at Isleworth, Middlesex [granted by King Æthelred (of Mercia)]; 70 hides at Battersea beside Hydaburna (the river Wandle), Surrey [granted by King Ceadwalla (of Wessex), cf. S 1248]; 1 hide iuxta London [granted by King Wulfhere (of Mercia)]; 10 hides supra vicum Londoniae [granted by Quoengyth, wife of .......aldi]; and 40 hides (cassatae) at Swanscombe and Erith, Kent [granted by King Æthelred (of Mercia)].	Latin, Barking	
1247			A.D. 678 (London, July)			Eorcenwold, bishop, to the monks of Chertsey; grant and confirmation of privileges and land.	Latin, Chertsey	
1248	82		A.D. 693 (13 June)	(? Eorcenwald), bishop	(? St Mary's, Barking)	Grant of 28 hides (manentes) at Battersea, 20 at Watsingaham (i.e. Washingham, lost, in Battersea) and 20 (cassatae) by Hidaburna (the river Wandle), all in Surrey. The land had been granted to him by Cædwalla, king of Wessex, and confirmed by Æthelred, king of Mercia.	Latin with English bounds, Westminster (probably ex Barking)	
1249	47		A.D. 680 (6 July)	Hædde, bishop (of Winchester)	Hæmgils, abbot (of Glastonbury)	Grant of 3 hides (cassati) at Leigh in Street and 2 hides (manentes) at Meare, Somerset.	Latin, Glastonbury	
1250	130		A.D. 714			Statement by Ecgwine, bishop of the Hwicce, of the lands he acquired for the minster at Evesham, including the minster at Fladbury, Worcestershire [obtained from King Æthelred (of Mercia) in exchange for the minster at Stratford-upon-Avon, Warwickshire]; 20 hides (mansae) at Twyford, Worcestershire [granted by Osward, Æthelred's brother]; 84 hides on both banks of the river Avon [granted by Cenred, king of Mercia]; 8 hides [granted by Æthelric, adolescens]; and land at the following places: Evesham, Bengeworth, Hampton, Lenchwick, Mortun (probably for Norton), Offenham, Littleton, 'the other Littleton', Badsey, Wickhamford, Church Honeybourne, Bretforton, all in Worcestershire; Willersey, Gloucestershire; Weethley, Sambourne, Kinwarton, Salford Priors and Abbots Salford, Warwickshire; Ombersley, Oldberrow, Abbots Morton, Worcestershire; Bourton-on-the-Water, Maugersbury, Adlestrop, (Lower) Swell, Gloucestershire; Mappleborough, Warwickshire; and Childswickham, Worcestershire	Latin, Evesham	
1251	131		A.D. 714			Statement by Ecgwine, bishop of the Hwicce, on the foundation and endowment of the minster at Evesham. The endowment included land at Stratford-upon-Avon, Warwickshire, and Chadbury, Worcestershire, and the minster at Fladbury, Worcestershire [granted by King Æthelred (of Mercia); the land at Stratford was later ceded to Æthelheard, subregulus of the Hwicce, in exchange for the restoration of Fladbury]; 84 hides (mansae) around Evesham, on both sides of the river Avon [granted by Cenred, king of Mercia, and Offa, king of the East Angles (recte Essex)]; 20 hides at Twyford, Worcestershire [granted by Osward]; 8 hides [granted by Æthelric, son of King Oshere]; and 8 hides [granted by Balterius, sacerdos].	Latin, Evesham	
1251a			A.D. 705			Aldhelm, bishop (of Sherborne), declares that he has agreed to remain abbot of his monasteries at Malmesbury, Frome and Bradford on Avon, Wiltshire, but confirms that the communities are to be free to elect their own abbots after his death.	Latin	
1252	76 d		A.D. 699 x 717	Ecgwine, bishop	Æthelheard	Grant for life of Fladbury minster and its endowment of 44 hides (manentes), with reversion to the church of Worcester, in exchange for 20 hides at Stratford-upon-Avon, Warwickshire	Latin, Worcester	
1253	128		A.D. 712	Forthhere, bishop (of Sherborne)	Ealdberht, abbot (of Glastonbury)	Grant of 1 hide (cassatus) by the river Axe, near Bleadney, Somerset.	Latin with bounds, Glastonbury	
1254	166		A.D. 718 x 745	Wilfred, bishop of the Hwicce	Leppa, comes, and his daughter, Beage	Lease, for two lives, of 5 hides (cassati) by the river Colne (at Bibury, Gloucestershire), with reversion to the see of Worcester.	Latin with English bounds, Worcester	
1255	217		A.D. 774	Milred, bishop of Worcester	Æthelburh, abbess	Lease, for life, of 21 hides (manentia) at Withington, Gloucestershire, with reversion to the church of St Peter, Worcester. The land had previously been granted by Oshere, subregulus of the Hwicce, to Dunne, famula Dei, and by Dunne to her grand-daughter Hrothwaru (cf. S 1429).	Latin, Worcester	
1256	186		A.D. 759	Cyneheard, bishop (of Winchester), and Cynewulf, king	Ecgwold, abbot, and his familia at Tisbury Minster, Wilts.	Confirmation of 30 hides by Fontmell Brook, Dorset, acquired by a predecessor of Ecgwold from another monastery.	Latin, Shaftesbury	
1257	241		A.D. 781 (Brentford, Middx)	Hathored, bishop of the Hwicce, with the consent of his familia at Worcester	Offa, king of Mercia	Surrender of 90 hides (manentes) with the minster at Bath and also 30 hides (cassati) by the river Avon, in exchange for the confirmation of 30 hides at Stratford-upon-Avon, Warwickshire, 38 at Sture (? Kidderminster Worcestershire, or Alderminster, Warwickshire), 14 (manentes) at Stour in Ismere and 12 at Bredon, Worcestershire, and 17 (cassati) at Hampton Lucy, Warwickshire	Latin, Worcester	
1258	291		A.D. 798 (Clofesho)	Æthelheard, archbishop of Canterbury	Cynethryth, abbess	Grant of the minsters at Cookham, Berkshire, and at Pectanege, in exchange for 60 hides (cassati) at Fleet, 30 at Teynham and 20 at the source of the Cray, Kent.	Latin, Canterbury, Christ Church	
1259	319		A.D. 805			Recovers for Christ Church 4 sulungs (aratra) at Bishopsbourne, Kent, originally granted by Aldhun, confiscated by Offa, king of Mercia, and now restored as the result of a synodal judgement.	Latin, Canterbury, Christ Church	
1260	308		A.D. 803 (Clofesho, 6 Oct)	Deneberht, bishop, and his familia at Worcester	Wulfheard	Confirmation of his life interest in land at Inkberrow and Bradley, Worcestershire	Latin, Worcester	
1261	307		? A.D. 814	Deneberht, bishop, and his familia at Worcester	Eanswith	Lease, for life, of 2 hides (cassati) at Harvington, Worcestershire, with reversion to the church of Worcester.	Latin, Worcester	
1262	304		A.D. 798 x 822	Deneberht, with the consent of the familia at Worcester	Balthun, priest	Lease, for two lives, of 6 hides (manentes) at Barnsley, Gloucestershire, and for three lives, of 8 hides at Colesborne, Gloucestershire, with reversion in each case to the church of Worcester.	Latin, Worcester	
1263	324		A.D. (801 x 803) x (805 x 814)	Ealhmund, bishop of Winchester	Brihthelm	Grant of 60 hides (cassati) at Farnham, Surrey, in exchange for 33 hides (manentes) at Wootton Rivers, Mildenhall, Froxfield and Bedwyn, Wiltshire, and 2 nights entertainment at Farnham every year for the bishop and his heirs, and an annual render of 10 jars of honey. If Brihthelm or any of his heirs wishes to sell the land, the church at Winchester is to be given the first option to purchase it, paying only for [40] hides.	Latin, Winchester, Old Minster	
1264	332		A.D. 811 (Canterbury, 21 April)	Wulfred, archbishop	Christ Church	Grant of 3 sulungs (aratra) at Folcwining lond in the district of Eastry, 1 at Liminum and 1 at Dunwaling lond, Kent, in exchange for 4 sulungs at Bishopsbourne, Kent. The land at Liminum had been granted to Wulfred by Coenwulf, king of Mercia, in exchange for land at Yarkhill, Herefordshire, which Wulfred had obtained from Queen Cynethryth. The land at Bishopsbourne had been given to Christ Church by Aldhun, confiscated by King Offa, and then restored.	Latin, Canterbury, Christ Church	
1265	342		A.D. 813 for 808 x 813	Wulfred, archbishop of Canterbury	Christ Church, Canterbury	Grant of constitution for the familia.	Latin, Canterbury, Christ Church	
1266	381, 382		A.D. 824 (Canterbury, 23 July)	Wulfred, archbishop	Christ Church, Canterbury	Grant of 5 sulungs (aratra) at Eythorne and Langdon in Eythorne, in exchange for 5 sulungs at Barham and Suithberhtincglond, Kent.	Latin with bounds, Canterbury, Christ Church	
1267	851		A.D. 826 (27 March, Canterbury)		Abbot Wernoth and the familia of St Augustine's, Canterbury	Grant of 6 iugera at Doddingland (? Dandelion, lost, near Margate) in Thanet, in exchange for 6 iugera at Ealdanford, near the mouth of the river Stour, Kent.	Latin with bounds, Canterbury, St Augustine's	
1268	380		A.D. 825 x 832	Wulfred, archbishop of Canterbury	Christ Church, Canterbury	Grant of 4 sulungs (aratra) at Sceldesforda near Wingham, Kent, plus the reversion of land given to Wulfred by Cyneheard the deacon and of a curtis within the monastery held by Dodda, monk. The curtis is to be used as an infirmary.	Latin with bounds, Canterbury, Christ Church	
1269	406		A.D. 833 x 870	Ceolnoth, archbishop of Canterbury	his familia at Canterbury	Grant of 2 sulungs (aratra) at Langdon, Kent.	Latin, Canterbury, Christ Church	
1270	429		A.D. 840 x 852	Cuthwulf, bishop, and the congregation of the church of Hereford	Ælfstan, dux	Lease, for three lives, of 4 hides (manentes) by the river Frome, Herefordshire, with reversion to Bromyard minster, Herefordshire	Latin, probably Hereford	
1271	443		A.D. 844 (? for 843)	(1) Ceolred, bishop (of Leicester)	Berhtwulf, king of Mercia	Grant of 14 hides (manentes) at Pangbourne, Berkshire, in return for the freedom of certain minsters. (2) King Berhtwulf grants the land to Æthelwulf, dux.	Latin, Abingdon	
1272	455(1)		A.D. 849 (Glen, Leics)	Alhhun, bishop, with his familia at Worcester	King Berhtwulf	Lease, for five lives, of 5 hides (manentes) at Wearset felda, 5 (cassati) at Cofton Hackett, 5 (manentes) at Rednal in King's Norton, 2 at Wast Hill and Hopwood in Alvechurch, Worcestershire, and 3 at Witlafesfeld, with reversion to the church of Worcester. With bounds of Cofton Hackett.	Latin with bounds in Latin and English, Worcester	
1273	490		A.D. 855 (Worcester)	Alhwine (Alhhun), bishop of Worcester	Æthelwulf, dux, and Wulfthryth, his wife	Lease, for their lives, of 11 hides (cassati) at Cutsdean, Gloucestershire, and at Sture (? Alderminster, Worcestershire), with reversion to the church of Worcester.	Latin, Worcester	
1274	495		A.D. 858 (Amesbury, Wilts)	(1) Swithhun, bishop of Winchester	Æthelbald, king of Wessex	Grant of 60 hides (cassati) at Farnham, Surrey. (2) King Æthelbald grants the reversion of the land, after his death, to the bishop and church of Winchester.	Latin, Winchester, Old Minster	
1275	543		A.D. 871 x 877	Ealhferth, bishop, and the community at Winchester	Cuthred, dux, and Wulfthryth, his wife	Lease, for three lives, of 8 hides at Easton, near Winchester, with reversion to the church at Winchester.	English with bounds, Winchester, Old Minster	
1276	562		(2) A.D. 963 x 975			Endorsement by King Edgar granting the land to Leofric.	English, Canterbury, Christ Church	
1276	562		(1) A.D. 889	Swithulf, bishop, and the community at Rochester	Beorhtwulf	Grant of a half sulung (aratrum) at Haddun (Haven Street in Frindsbury), with meadows at Beckley and Strood, Kent.	Latin with English bounds	
1277	544		A.D. 877 (Winchester)	Tunbeorht, bishop	the refectory of his brethren (at Winchester)	Grant of 5 hides (manentes) at Nursling, Hampshire	Latin with English bounds, Winchester, Old Minster	
1278	533		A.D. 872	Wærferth, bishop of Worcester, and the Worcester familia	Eanwulf, minister	Lease, for four lives, of 2 hides (mansae or mansiones) at Nuthurst, Warwickshire, in return for 20 mancuses of gold, with reversion to the monastery of Stratford-upon-Avon, Warwickshire	Latin, Worcester	
1279	580		A.D. 899	Wærferth, bishop of Worcester	Werwulf, presbiter	Lease, for two lives, of 5 hides (manentes) at Ablington on the river Coln, Gloucestershire, the holder to pay chuch-scot and soul-scot to (the minster at) Bibury, Gloucestershire	Latin, Worcester	
1280	608		A.D. 904	Wærferth, bishop, and the community at Worcester	Æthelred and Æthelflæd, their lords	Lease, for their lives and that of Ælfwyn, their daughter, of a messuage (haga) in Worcester and land at Barbourne in North Claines, Worcestershire, with reversion to the bishop. Bounds of appurtentant meadow west of the Severn.	Latin with English and English bounds, Worcester	
1281	609		A.D. 904	Wærferth, bishop, with the Worcester community	Wulfsige, his reeve	Lease, for three lives, of 1 hide at Aston Magna, Gloucestershire, just as Herred held it.	English, Worcester	
1282	616		A.D. 907	Wærferth, bishop (of Worcester), with the permission of King Alfred and of Æthelred and Æthelflæd	Cynhelm, his kinsman	Lease, for three lives, of 10 hides (manentes) at Bengeworth, Worcestershire, with reversion to the bishopric. The land had been granted to the church of Worcester by Burgred, king of Mercia, and Bishop Alhhun.	Latin, Worcester	
1283	560		A.D. 899 x 904 (Worcester)	Wærferth, bishop	Cyneswith, his kinswoman	Lease, for three lives, of 3 hides at Elmstone Hardwicke, Gloucestershire, with reversion to Bishop's Cleeve, for the bishopric. The other 2 hides at Elmstone Hardwicke, of the 5 hides leased by the community to Bishop Wærferth (cf. S 1415), are to belong to Prestbury for as long as the lease runs.	English, Worcester	
1284	590		A.D. 900 (Winchester)	Denewulf, bishop of Winchester, and his brethren there	Ordlaf, comes	Grant of 10 hides (manentes) at Lydiard, Wilts [given to Winchester by Ordlaf's grandfather, Eanwulf]; in exchange Ordlaf gives the bishop 10 hides at Fonthill, Wiltshire, and the bishop gives his familia 3 hides at Ebincgtun (Yavington in Avington, Hampshire).	Latin, Winchester, Old Minster	
1285	599		A.D. 902	Denewulf, bishop, and the community at Winchester	Beornwulf	Lease of 15 hides at Ebbesborne, Wiltshire, with witnessed post-script giving details about the fate of ceorls, penal serfs and slaves attached to the estate.	English, Winchester, Old Minster	
1286	611		A.D. 904 (Bicanleag, ? Bickleigh, Devon)	Denewulf, bishop of Winchester, and his familia	King Edward	Grant of 20 hides (manentes) at Stoce near Shalbourne, Wiltshire, in exchange for privileges for the minster at Taunton.	Latin, Winchester, Old Minster	
1287	617		A.D. 879 x 908	Denewulf, bishop, and the community at Winchester	Alfred	Lease, for life, of 40 hides at Alresford, Hampshire, with reversion to St Peter's (Old Minster, Winchester).	English, Winchester, Old Minster	
1288	638		A.D. 924, probably for 905 (or 920)	Plegmund, archbishop	Byrthræd	Lease, for three lives, of 80 iugera at Wærincg mersc, near the river Rumenesea, Kent, in return for a payment of 385 pence, with reversion of Christ Church.	Latin with bounds, Canterbury, Christ Church	
1289	636		A.D. 922	Wilfrid, bishop	the community at Worcester	Grant of land at Clifford Chambers, Warwickshire	English with bounds, Worcester	
1290	993		A.D. 957	Cenwald, bishop of the Hwicce	Behstan, priest in the monastery of Worcester	Grant, for four lives, of land in three places at Tapenhall in North Claines and 1 hide at Grimanhyll (Greenhill in Hallow, Worcestershire).	Latin, Worcester	
1291	997		A.D. 957			Records the restoration to the bishopric and minster of Selsey by King Eadwig of lands fraudulently seized by Ælfsige. The lands recovered comprise 42 hides at Selsey, Wittering, Itchenor, Birdham, Egesawyda, Brinfast and Sidlesham, 7 hides at Aldingbourne and Lidsey, 8 at [Amberley and] Houghton, 4 at Coldwaltham and 9 at (North) Mundham, all in Sussex.	Latin with English bounds, Selsey	
1292	972		A.D. 956 x 957			Agreement between Brihthelm, bishop, and Æthelwold abbot (of Abingdon) whereby Brihthelm gives land at Kennington, Berkshire, to Abingdon, in exchange for land at Curbridge, Oxfordshire	English, Abingdon	
1293	1050		A.D. 959 (1 April)			Proclaims the confirmation and grant by King Edgar to the church of St Peter, Westminster, of extensive privileges and lands, comprising 5 hides (mansae) at Westminster [for which Dunstan gave Edgar 120 mancuses of gold, cf. S 670], 5 hides at Blecenham (lost, in Hendon, Middlesex) and 6 at Lothereslege (lost, in Hendon) [for which Dunstan gave Edgar 10 mancuses of gold]; 10 hides at Hendon, Middlesex, and another 10 hides there [purchased from Æthelwold, bishop of Winchester, and Wulfnoth, miles, for 80 pounds of silver, cf. S 1295]; 3 hides (cassati) at Codenhleaw [purchased from Eadnoth, minister, for 12 pounds]; 8 hides (mansae) at Hanwell, Hertfordshire [acquired from Ælfwine, minister, in return for 30 pounds of silver needed for a pilgrimage to Rome]; 10 hides at Sunbury, Middlesex [purchased from Ælfheah, dux, for 200 mancuses of gold, cf. S 702]; land at Shepperton, Middlesex [purchased from Ealhflæd, widow, for 60 bizanteis nummis]; 5 hides at Brickendon, Hertfordshire [given to Westminster by Ælfhelm Polga, cf. S 1487]; 3 hides at Sullington, Sussex [given to Westminster by Ælfwine, prefectus in Kent]; the reversion of land at Parham, Sussex [purchased from Wulfnoth for 30 mancuses of gold]; land at Paddington, Cowley Peachey, Middlesex; and at Ewell, Kent.	Latin, Westminster	
1294	1179		A.D. 966 (St Paul's, London)	Dunstan, archbishop of Canterbury, Oscytel, archbishop of York, and others	Crowland Abbey	Confirmation of lands and privileges.	Latin, Crowland	
1295	1263		A.D. 963 x 975	(Dunstan), archbishop	Westminster Abbey	Grant of 20 hides (mansae) at Hendon, Middlesex, purchased from Æthelwold, bishop of Winchester, and Wulfnoth, brother of Sigered, for respective payments of 60 and 20 pounds.	Latin, Westminster	
1296			A.D. 981 x 988		King Æthelred	Letter concerning estates belonging to the diocese of Cornwall including Pawton in St Breock, Cællwic, and Lawhitton, Cornwall.	English, Exeter (ex Crediton, ? ex St German's)	
1297	1108		A.D. 943 for 963	Oswald, bishop of Worcester	Cynethegn	Lease, for three lives, of 2.5 hides (mansae) at Oddingley and Laughern, Worcestershire, with appurtenances, including a messuage (haga) to the south of Worcester, with reversion to the bishopric of Worcester.	Latin with English bounds, Worcester	
1298	1091		A.D. 962	Oswald, bishop	Ælfwold, minister	Lease, for his life and that of his mother, of 3 hides (cassatae) at Cungle (on the river Coln, Gloucestershire), with reversion to the bishopric of Worcester. The land was previously held by Ealhthryth, matrona.	Latin, Worcester	
1299	1086		A.D. 962	Oswald, bishop	Æthelm	Lease, for two [? recte three] lives, of 2.5 hides at Elmstree in Tetbury, Gloucestershire, with reversion to the bishopric of Worcester.	English, Worcester	
1300	1088		A.D. 962		Cynhelm, his minister	Lease, for three lives, of 6 hides (mansae) at Upton-upon-Severn, Gloucestershire, with reversion to the bishopric of Worcester.	Latin with English bounds, Worcester	
1301	1087		A.D. 962	Oswald, bishop	Eadmær, his minister	Lease, for three lives, of 2 hides (mansae) at Bentley in Holt, saltpans at Upwich (lost, in Droitwich) and woodland at Bradley, all in Worcestershire, with reversion to the church of Worcester.	Latin with English bounds, Worcester	
1302	1089		A.D. 962	Oswald, bishop	Ealhferth, one of his deacons	Lease, for three lives, of 1 hide (mansa) at Cassey Compton in Withington, Gloucestershire, with reversion to the bishopric of Worcester.	Latin, Worcester	
1303	1106		A.D. 963	Oswald, bishop	Ælfric, his minster	Lease, for three lives, of 1 hide (mansa) at Cotheridge, Worcestershire, with reversion to the church of Worcester. A note, in English, names Æthelsige, son of Ælfric, as the second life, and one of his male descendants as the third.	Latin and English with English bounds, Worcester	
1304	1105		A.D. 963	Oswald, bishop	Æthelnoth, his minister	Lease, for three lives, of 1 hide (mansa) at Harford in Naunton, Gloucestershire, with reversion to the church of Worcester.	Latin with English bounds, Worcester	
1305	1110		A.D. 963	Oswald, bishop	Athelstan, his thegn	Lease, for three lives, of 3 hides at Thorne in Inkberrow, Worcestershire, with reversion to the bishopric.	English with bounds, Worcester	
1306	1109		A.D. 963	Oswald, bishop	Eadmær, his minister	Lease, for three lives, of 1 hide (mansa) at Redmarley D'Abitot, Gloucestershire, with reversion to the church of Worcester.	Latin with English bounds, Worcester	
1307	1111		A.D. 963	Oswald, bishop	Wulfric	Lease, for three lives, of 4 hides (mansae) at Teodeces leage and at Apsley (Heath) in Tanworth, Warwickshire, with reversion to the bishopric of Worcester.	Latin with English bounds, Worcester	
1308	1166		A.D. 965 for circa 991 (Worcester)	Oswald, bishop	Athelstan, his brother	Lease, for three lives, of 2 hides (manentes) at Southam Delabere in Bishops Cleeve, Gloucestershire, and 2 at Mitton in Bredon, Worcestershire	Latin, Worcester	
1309	1180		A.D. 966	Oswald, bishop	Ælfhild	Lease, for three lives, of 3 hides at Hindlip, Worcestershire, with reversion to the bishopric.	English, Worcester	
1310	1182		A.D. 966	Oswald, bishop	Eadric, his compater	Lease, for three lives, of 3 hides, consisting of 1.5 hides at Alveston, Warwickshire, every other acre in the divided hide at Upper Stratford, every third acre of open land at Fachan leage, and small areas of woodland and meadow, with reversion to the bishopric.	Latin with English, Worcester	
1311	1181		A.D. 966	Oswald, bishop	Wihthelm, his minister	Lease, for three lives, of 2 hides (mansae) at Clifford Chambers, Warwickshire, with reversion to the church of Worcester.	Latin, Worcester	
1312	1206		A.D. 967	Oswald, bishop	Æthelweard, his minister	Lease, for three lives, of land at Itchington in Tytherington, Gloucestershire, with reversion to the church of Worcester.	Latin with English, Worcester	
1313	1202		A.D. 967	Oswald, bishop	Eadmær, his minister	Lease, for three lives, of 6 hides (manentes or cassati) at Stoke Orchard, Gloucestershire, with reversion to the church of Worcester.	Latin with English, Worcester	
1314	542		A.D. 967	Oswald, bishop	Hæhstan, his minister	Lease, for three lives, of 2 hides (mansae) at Pendock and 1 at Didcot in Beckford, Worcestershire	Latin with English bounds, Worcester	
1315	1204		A.D. 967	Oswald, bishop of Worcester	Osulf, his brother	Lease, for three lives, of 2 hides (mansae) at Bradanbeorh and at Holdfast in Ripple, Worcestershire, with reversion to the bishopric, in exchange for 3 hides at Spetchley, Worcestershire, leased to the clerici of Worcester, with reversion to the bishopric.	Latin with English, Worcester	
1316	1207		A.D. 967	Oswald, bishop of Worcester	Wulfgar, his minister	Lease, for three lives, of 2 hides (mansae) at Itchington in Tytherington, Gloucestershire	Latin with English, Worcester	
1317	1236		A.D. 969	Oswald, bishop	Æthelweard, his minister	Lease, for three lives, of 2 hides (mansae) at Stoke Bishop, Gloucestershire, with reversion to the bishopric.	Latin with English and English bounds, Worcester	
1318	1232		A.D. 969	Oswald, bishop of Worcester	Ætheleard (? Æthelweard), his fidelis	Lease, for three lives, of 7 hides (mansae) at Tiddington in Alveston, Warwickshire, and at Faccanlea, with reversion to the church of Worcester.	Latin with English, Worcester	
1319	1237		A.D. 969	Oswald, bishop	Ælfweard, his fidelis	Lease, for three lives, of 1 hide (mansa) at Theofecan Hyl (Worcestershire).	Latin with English bounds, Worcester	
1320	1241		A.D. 969	Oswald, bishop	Brihtmær, his minister	Lease, for, three lives, of 1 hide (mansa) at Whitlinge in Hartlebury, Worcestershire, with reversion to the church of Worcester.	Latin with English and English bounds, Worcester	
1321	1243		A.D. 969	Oswald, bishop	Byrnric, his fidelis	Lease, for three lives, of 4.5 hides (mansi) at Longdon in Tredington, Worcestershire, with reversion to the bishopric.	Latin with English bounds, Worcester	
1322	1235		A.D. 969	Oswald, bishop	Cynhelm, his faithful minister	Lease, for three lives, of 5 hides (mansae) at Croome D'Abitot, Worcestershire, with reversion to the bishopric.	Latin with English and English bounds, Worcester	
1323	1242		A.D. 969	Oswald, bishop	Eadmær, his minister	Lease, for three lives, of 3 hides (mansi) at Little Witley, Worcestershire, with reversion to the bishopric.	Latin with English bounds, Worcester	
1324	1239		A.D. 969	Oswald, bishop	Eadric, his minister	Lease, for three lives, of 4 hides (mansae) at Saberton in Beckford, Gloucestershire, previously held by Ealhstan, with reversion to the church of Worcester.	Latin, Worcester	
1325	1238		A.D. 969	Oswald, bishop	Ealhstan, his fidelis	Lease of 8 hides (mansae) at Evenlode, Gloucestershire, with reversion to the church of Worcester.	Latin with English bounds, Worcester	
1326	1233		A.D. 969	Oswald, bishop	his kinsman Osulf, the cniht	Lease, for three lives, of land at Teddington and Alstone, Gloucestershire, with reversion first to Eadleofu, his wife (if his children do not survive), and then to two of her brothers, with ultimate reversion to the church of Worcester.	English, Worcester	
1327	1240		A.D. 969	Oswald, bishop	Wulfgar, clericus	Lease, for three lives, of 1 hide (mansa), with the church etcirca, at Battenhall in St Peter's-without-Worcester and at Perry in St Martin's-without-Worcester, including a messuage (haga) in Worcester.	Latin with English and English bounds, Worcester	
1328	1293		A.D. 973 (London)	Oswald, archbishop	Brihtric	Lease, for two lives, of 5 hides (mansae) at Brightwell Baldwin, Oxfordshire, with reversion to the church of Worcester.	Latin, Worcester	
1329	1298		A.D. 974	Oswald, archbishop	Brihtlaf, his minister	Lease, for three lives, of 1 hide (mansa) at Cudley in St Martin's-without-Worcester, with reversion to the church of Worcester.	Latin with English bounds, Worcester	
1330		614	A.D. 977	Oswald, archbishop	Ælfweard, his fidelis	Lease, for three lives, of 5 hides (mansae) at Tidmington, Warwickshire, with reversion to the bishopric of Worcester.	Latin with English bounds, Worcester	
1331		613	A.D. 977	Oswald, archbishop	Athelstan, his fidelis	Lease, for three lives, of 1 hide (mansa) at Inkberrow, Worcestershire, with reversion to the bishopric of Worcester.	Latin, Worcester	
1332		612	A.D. 977	Oswald, archbishop	Æthelwold, his cniht	Lease, for three lives, of 2 hides, less 60 acres, at Wolverton in Stoulton, Worcestershire, with reversion to the bishopric of Worcester.	English, Worcester	
1333		615	A.D. 977	Oswald, bishop	Cynulf, his minister	Lease, for three lives, of 1 hide (mansa) at Aston Magna, Gloucestershire, with reversion to the bishopric of Worcester.	Latin, Worcester	
1334		617	A.D. 977	Oswald, archbishop	Eadric, his minister	Lease, for three lives, of 3 hides (mansae) at Tiddington, Warwickshire, with reversion to the bishopric of Worcester.	Latin with English, Worcester	
1335	1299		A.D. 977 (? for 974)	Oswald, archbishop	Wulfheah, his fidelis	Lease, for three lives, of 5 hides (mansae) at Cutsdean, Gloucestershire, with reversion to the bishopric of Worcester.	Latin with English bounds, Worcester	
1336		616	A.D. 977	Oswald, archbishop	Wynsige, monk	Lease, for three lives, of 3 hides (mansae) at Little Washbourne, Gloucestershire, with reversion to the bishopric of Worcester.	Latin with English, Worcester	
1337		620	A.D. 978	Oswald, archbishop	Ælfnoth, his minister	Lease, for three lives, of 2 hides (mansae) at Blackwell in Tredington, Warwickshire, with reversion to the church of Worcester.	Latin with English and English bounds, Worcester	
1338		619	A.D. 978	Oswald, archbishop	Æthelmund, his minister	Lease, for three lives, of one hide (mansa) at Redmarley D'Abitot, Gloucestershire, with reversion to the church of Worcester.	Latin with English and English bounds, Worcester	
1339		618	A.D. 978	Oswald, archbishop	Æthelnoth, his minister	Lease, for three lives, of 1 hide (mansa) at Smite in Hindlip, Worcestershire, with reversion to the church of Worcester.	Latin with English and English bounds, Worcester	
1340		623	A.D. 979	Oswald, archbishop	Athelstan, his brother	Lease, for three lives, of 3 hides (mansae) at Daylesford, Gloucestershire, with reversion to the bishopric of Worcester.	Latin with English bounds, Worcester	
1341		625	A.D. 980	Oswald, bishop	Ælfweard, miles	Lease, for life, of land at Bengeworth, Worcestershire, with reversion, first to Eadwine, miles, then to one of his brothers and finally to the church of St Mary, Worcester.	Latin, Worcester	
1342		627	A.D. 980	Oswald, archbishop	Wulfgar, his clericus	Lease, for three lives, of 5 hides (mansae) at Waresley in Hartlebury, Worcestershire, with reversion to the church of Worcester.	Latin with English and English bounds, Worcester	
1343		631	A.D. 981	Oswald, archbishop	Athelstan, his miles	Extension, for two further lives, of a lease of 3 hides (cassati) at Pegglesworth in Dowdeswell, Gloucestershire, granted by Bishop Cenwold to Athelstan's father, with ultimate reversion to the bishopric of Worcester.	Latin, Worcester	
1344		634	A.D. 982	Oswald, archbishop	Wulfhelm, his artifex	Lease, for two lives, of 1 hide (mansa) at an unspecified place, with reversion to the church of St Mary (Worcester).	Latin, Worcester	
1345		637	A.D. 983	Oswald, archbishop	Gardulf, his kinsman	Lease, with limitations for three lives, of 5 hides (mansae) at Abbots Lench, Worcestershire, with reversion to the church of Worcester.	Latin, Worcester	
1346		646	A.D. 984	Oswald, archbishop	Æthelweard, his miles	Lease, for three lives, of 3 hides (mansae) at Stoke Bishop, Gloucestershire, with reversion to the bishopric of Worcester.	Latin with English bounds, Worcester	
1347			A.D. 984	Oswald, archbishop	Cynelm, his minister	Lease, for three lives, of 2.5 hides (mansae) at Caldinccotan, in Bredon, Worcestershire, with reversion to the bishopric of Worcester.	Latin with English and English bounds, Worcester	
1348		645	A.D. 984	Oswald, archbishop of York and bishop of Worcester	Eadwig, his kinsman, and Wulfgifu, Eadwig's wife	Grant to them and their heirs of 3 hides (mansae) at Lower Wolverton in Stoulton, Worcestershire; failing heirs it is to pass to two heirs of their choice.	Latin with English bounds, Worcester	
1349		644	A.D. 984	Oswald, archbishop of York and bishop of Worcester	Wulfflæd, matron	Lease, for life, of 4 hides (manentes) at Inkberrow, Worcestershire, with reversion to the church of Worcester.	Latin, Worcester	
1350		651	A.D. 985	Oswald, archbishop	Eadric, his minister	Lease, for three lives, of 5 hides (mansae) at Tiddington and Alveston, Warwickshire, with reversion to the church of Worcester.	Latin with English and English bounds, Worcester	
1351		653	A.D. 985	Oswald, bishop of Worcester	Leofwine, his amicus	Lease, for three lives, of a half hide (manens) at Hartlebury, Worcestershire, with reversion to the church of Worcester.	Latin with English bounds, Worcester	
1352		649	A.D. 985	Oswald, archbishop of the Hwicce	Wulfgar, clericus	Lease, for three lives, of 1 hide (mansa) at Clopton in St John-in-Bedwardine, Worcestershire, with reversion to the church of Worcester, and of a messuage (haga) binnan mynstre on porte (Worcester), bequeathed by Wulfric, mass-priest, to his kinsman Wulfward.	Latin with English and English bounds, Worcester	
1353		660	A.D. 987	Oswald, archbishop	Æthelmund	Lease, for three lives, of 5 hides (mansae) at Cutsdean, Gloucestershire, with reversion to the bishopric.	Latin with English bounds, Worcester	
1354		661	A.D. 987	Oswald, archbishop	Leofward, his man	Lease, for two lives, of 5 hides (manentes) at Golder in Pyrton, Oxfordshire, with church-scot and the produce of one acre to be paid to the church at Pyrton.	Latin, Worcester	
1355	1205		A.D. 988	Oswald, bishop of Worcester	Ælfwine, his nephew	Lease, for three lives, of 2 hides (mansae) at Bradanbeorhge and at Holdfast in Ripple, Worcestershire, with reversion to the bishopric, in exchange for 3 hides at Spetchley, Worcestershire, leased to the clerici of Worcester, with reversion to the bishopric.	Latin with English, Worcester	
1356		667	A.D. 988	Oswald, bishop of Worcester and archbishop of York	Æthelweard, his minister	Lease, for three lives, of 3 hides (mansae) at Clifforda, Warwickshire, with reversion to the church of Worcester.	Latin with English bounds, Worcester	
1357		668	A.D. 988	Oswald, archbishop	Æthelweard	Lease, for three lives, of 1.5 hides at Upton in Tetbury, Gloucestershire, with reversion to the church of Worcester.	Latin, Worcester	
1358		666	A.D. 988	Oswald, archbishop	Eadric, his minister	Lease, for three lives, of 3.5 hides (mansae) at Clopton, Warwickshire, with 6 acres of meadow opposite the mill at Alveston and half the mill at Bluntesige (? near Blunts Green in Wootton Wawen, Warwickshire), with reversion to St Mary's (Worcester).	Latin with English, Worcester	
1359		671	A.D. 989	Oswald, archbishop	Byrcstan, his minister	Lease, for three lives, of 1.5 hides (mansae) at Bredons Norton, Worcestershire	Latin, Worcester	
1360		630	A.D. 989	Oswald, archbishop	Eadwig, his minister	Lease, for three lives, of 1 hide (mansa) at Cassey Compton in Withington, Gloucestershire, with reversion to the church of Worcester.	Latin, Worcester	
1361		670	A.D. 989 (for 983 x 985)	Oswald, archbishop	Gardulf, his kinsman	Lease, for three lives, of 4 hides (mansae) at Whittington, Worcestershire, with reversion to the bishopric of Worcester.	Latin with English bounds, Worcester	
1362		675	A.D. 990	Oswald, archbishop	Æthelmær, his man	Lease, for three lives, of 1 hide at Compton Greenfield and 1 at Marsh, Gloucestershire, in return for 2 pounds of silver and livestock, with postscript granting the worthig at Brynes hamme which Æthelm owned. Bounds of Marsh.	English with bounds, Worcester	
1363		674	A.D. 990	Oswald, archbishop	Beornheah and his brother, Byrhstan	Lease, for three lives, of 2 hides at Moreton in Bredon, Worcestershire, in return for four pounds of sterling money.	Latin with English, Worcester	
1364		677	A.D. 991	Oswald, archbishop	Ælfstan, his man	Lease, for three lives, of 1 hide (mansa) at Itchington in Tytherington, Gloucestershire, with reversion to the church of Worcester.	Latin, Worcester	
1365		678	A.D. 991	Oswald, archbishop	Æthelmær, his artifex	Lease, for three lives, of 2 hides (mansae) at Æsctun (possibly Ashton-under-Hill, Worcestershire), with reversion to the church.	Latin, Worcester	
1366		676	A.D. 991	Oswald, archbishop	Eadric, his thegn	Lease, for two lives, of 2 hides at Talton and 1 at Newbold, both in Tredington, Warwickshire, and the inlond which Lyfing had.	English, Worcester	
1367		679	A.D. 972 x 992 (? 985)	Oswald, archbishop	Ælfsige, his cliens	Lease, for three lives, of a messuage (curta) and a croft in Worcester, with reversion to the bishopric..	Latin with English, Worcester	
1368	1136		circa A.D. 964	Oswald, bishop of Worcester	King Edgar	Letter setting out conditions on which he grants leases.	Latin, Worcester	
1369		683	? A.D. 987	Oswald, archbishop	Goding, priest	Lease, for three lives, of 3 hides at Bredicot, a yardland at Genenofre, 7 acres of meadow in the hamm belonging to Tibberton, and a messuage by the gate (in Worcester).	English and Latin with English bounds, Worcester	
1370	1139		A.D. 961 x 972 (? 969)	Oswald, bishop of Worcester	Osulf, his brother	Lease, for three lives, of 4 hides (mansi) at Grimley, 1 at Moseley in Grimley and a half hide at Wick Episcopi in St-John-in-Bedwardine, with reversion to the bishopric.	Latin with English and English bounds, Worcester	
1371		1286	A.D. 972 x 992			Declares that the community of Ramsey have granted him a lease, for life, of land at Stura, Worcestershire, and that he has leased it to Osulf, his kinsman.	Latin, Ramsey	
1372		682	A.D. 975 x 978 (? 977)	Oswald, archbishop	Wulfgar, priest	Lease, for three lives, of 1 hide at Little Witley, Worcestershire, with reversion to the bishopric of Worcester.	English with bounds, Worcester	
1373		680	A.D. 975 x 978 (? 977)	Oswald, archbishop	Wulfgeat, his cniht	Lease, for three lives, of 1 hide at Himbleton (i.e. Huddington), Worcestershire, with reversion to the bishopric of Worcester.	English with bounds, Worcester	
1374		681	A.D. 975 x 978 (? 977)	Oswald, archbishop	Wulfheah, priest	Lease, for three lives, of a yardland at Genenofre, with reversion to the bishopric of Worcester.	English with bounds, Worcester	
1375	1184		A.D. 961 x 984 (probably 982)	Oswald, (bishop)	Wulfhelm, his faithful artifex	Lease, for three lives, of 1 hide (mansa) at an unspecified place, with reversion the church of Worcester.	Latin, Worcester	
1376		1347	A.D. 975 x 978	Æthelwold, bishop, and the community at Old Minster, Winchester	Ælfwine	Grant of 12 hides at Moredon in Rodbourne Cheney, Wiltshire, in exchange for 2 acres within Winchester.	Latin and English versions, Winchester, Old Minster	
1377	1131		A.D. 963 x 975 (? 971 x 975)			Exchange of land at Washington, Sussex, for land at Yaxley, Huntingdonshire (given to Thorney), and at Ailsworth, Northamptonshire (given to Peterborough). The Ailsworth estate was forfeited by a widow and her son condemned for witchcraft.	English, Peterborough	
1378		690	A.D. 995	Æscwig, bishop of Dorchester	Ælfric, archbishop, and Christ Church, Canterbury	Return of land at Monks Risborough, Buckinghamshire, mortgaged to him by Archbishop Sigeric.	Latin, Canterbury, Christ Church	
1379		691	A.D. 995 (for 994)	Æscwig, bishop of Dorchester	Ælfstan, his man	Grant of 5 hides (mansae) at Cuxham, Oxfordshire	Latin with English bounds, uncertain	
1380			A.D. 996 (for 994)			Eswich (? Ashwood), Bilston, Willenhall, Wednesfield, Pelsall, Ogley, Hilton near Wall, Hatherton, Kinvaston, Hilton near Wolverhampton, and Featherstone, all in Staffordshire	Latin with English bounds, Wolverhampton	
1381		695	A.D. 996	Ealdwulf, archbishop	Leofenath, his miles	Lease, for three lives, of 40 agri at Huneshom and a fishery, with reversion to the church of Worcester.	Latin with English bounds, Worcester	
1382		702	[A.D. 998] (London)	Wulfsige, bishop	the monks of St Mary's church, Sherborne	Confirmation of their endowment and grant of 1 hide (cassatus) and named privileges at Sherborne, Dorset.	Latin, Sherborne	
1383		708	A.D. 1001 x 1012			Writ of Bishop Æthelric complaining of losses sustained by the bishopric of Sherborne in respect of lands which contributed to the ship-scot, and appealing to Æthelmær so that they may be restored. The lands named are: 1 hide at Bubbancumbe (probably Bookham (Farm) in Buckland Newton, Dorset), 2 at Alton Pancras, 7 at Up Cerne, 6 at Clifton (Maybank), [6] at Hiwisce, 2 at Trill in Beer Hackett, 1 at Wyllon (? Wool), 5 at Brockhampton in Stinsford, 3 at Dibberfordall, in Dorset; 3 at Peder[...]; and land at Holcombe Rogus, Devon.	English, Sherborne	
1384		1313	A.D. 1017	Wulfstan, archbishop	Ælfwig, his brother	Lease, for three lives, of 6 hides (manentes) at Bentley in Holt, Worcestershire, and salt-ovens at Droitwich, with reversion to the church of Worcester.	Latin with English bounds, Worcester	
1385			A.D. 1003 x 1016	Wulfstan, archbishop	Wulfgifu	Lease, for three lives, of a half (mansa) hide at Perry Wood in St Martin's-without-Worcester, with reversion to the church of Worcester.	Latin with English bounds, Worcester	
1386		1314	A.D. 1020			Writ of Archbishop Wulfstan; informing King Cnut and Queen Ælfgifu (Emma) that Æthelnoth has been consecrated to the see of Canterbury.	English, Canterbury, Christ Church	
1387			A.D. 1016 x 1020, probably 1018	Eadnoth, bishop	Beorhtnoth	Mortgage of a yardland by the river Creedy, Devon (? Creedy Barton in Newton St Cyres).	English and Latin with English bounds, Exeter (ex Crediton)	
1388		724	A.D. 1016	Leofsige, bishop	Godric, his minister	Lease, for three lives, of 1 hide (mansa) at Bishopton, Warwickshire, and a haga in Warwick.	Latin with English and English bounds, Worcester	
1389		974	A.D. 1037	Æthelnoth, archbishop of Christ Church	Christ Church	Grant of land at Godmersham which he had bought from Earl Sired for 72 marks of gold.	English and Latin versions, Canterbury, Christ Church	
1390		754	A.D. 1020 x 1038	Æthelnoth, archbishop	Ælfwold and Eadred, his ministri	Lease of 50 agri at St Mary's Abbey, Reculver, to be held at the will of Guichardus, deacon of St Mary's.	Latin, Canterbury, Christ Church	
1391		768	A.D. 1043 x 1044	Ælfwine, bishop, and the community at Old Minster, Winchester	Osgod	Lease, for life, of land at Adderbury, Oxfordshire, in exchange for land at Wroxall, Isle of Wight, with reversion to the Old Minster.	English, Winchester, Old Minster	
1392		760	A.D. 1038	Lyfing, bishop of Worcester	Æthelr[...]	Lease, for three lives, of 5 hides (mansae) at Hill Croome and Baughton, Worcestershire, with reversion to the bishopric.	Latin, Worcester	
1393			A.D. 1038	Lyfing, bishop	Earcytel	Lease, for three lives, of 2 hides (cassati) at Tapenhall in North Claines, Worcestershire, and two hagas in Worcester, with reversion to the bishopric of Worcester.	Latin with English bounds, Worcester	
1394			A.D. 1042	Lyfing, bishop	Æthelric, his thegn	Lease, for three lives, of 2 hides at Armscote in Tredington, Warwickshire, in return for a money payment.	English, Worcester	
1395		765	A.D. 1042	Lyfing, bishop	Æthelric	Lease, for three lives, of 6 hides (mansae) at Bentley in Holt, Worcestershire, and a haga in Worcester, with reversion to the bishopric.	Latin with English bounds, Worcester	
1396		764	A.D. 1042	Lyfing, bishop of Worcester	Æthelric, his faithful man	Lease, for three lives, of 2 hides (mansae) at Elmley Castle, Worcestershire, with reversion to the bishopric.	Latin with English bounds, Worcester	
1397		777	A.D. 1045		?	Lease, for three lives, of land at Saberton in Beckford, Gloucestershire, with reversion to the bishopric.	Latin, Worcester	
1398		941	A.D. 1042 x 1046 (Bedwyn, Wilts)	Lyfing, bishop	Mannig, abbot	Confirmation of privileges and of Leofric's grant to Evesham Abbey of land at Hampton, Worcestershire	Latin, Evesham	
1399			A.D. 1033 x 1038	Brihtheah, bishop	Wulfmær, his cniht	Lease, for three lives, of 2 hides at Aston Blank (alias Cold Ashton), Gloucestershire	English, Worcester	
1400			A.D. 1038 x 1050	Eadsige, archbishop	St Augustine's, Canterbury	Grant of land near Canterbury.	English, Canterbury, Christ Church	
1401		1333	A.D. 1042 x 1050	Eadsige, archbishop	St Augustine's, Canterbury	Grant of land at Littlebourne, Kent, given to him by King Edward (cf. S 1050).	Latin, Canterbury, St Augustine's	
1402		820	A.D. 1047 x 1057	Stigand, bishop, and the community at Old Minster	Æthelmær	Lease, for his lifetime and that of his son, Sæman, of 1 hide at Sparsholt, Hampshire, in return for a sum of money.	English, Winchester, Old Minster	
1403	390	949	A.D. 1047 x 1053	Stigand, bishop, and the community at Old Minster	Wulfric	Lease, for two lives, of 2 hides and one yardland at Alton Priors and three yardlands at Patney, Wiltshire, with meadow and pasture.	English, Winchester, Old Minster	
1404		948	A.D. 1045 x 1048			Writ of Bishop Siward concerning Brihtwine's claim to Leckhampstead, Berkshire	Latin, Abingdon	
1405			A.D. 1058	Ealdred, bishop	Dodda, his minister	Lease, for life, of 2 hides (mansae) and a yardland at Bredons Norton, Worcestershire, with reversion to the bishopric.	Latin with English and English bounds, Worcester	
1406		923	A.D. 1046 x 1053	Ealdred, bishop	Athelstan 'the fat'	Lease, for three lives, of 2 hides at Hill and Moor, Worcestershire	English, Worcester	
1407			? A.D. 1053	Ealdred, bishop	Balwine, his man	Lease, for three lives, of 2 hides (mansi) and a yardland at West tun (Weston-on-Avon, Warwickshire), with reversion to St Mary's, Worcester.	Latin, Worcester	
1408		805	A.D. 1052 x 1056 (? 1051 x 1055)	Ealdred, bishop of Worcester	the brethren of St Mary's, Worcester	Grant of 3 hides at Teddington and Alstone, Gloucestershire, and a messuage (curtis) in Worcester.	Latin, Worcester	
1409		804	A.D. 1051 x 1055	Ealdred, bishop	Wulfgeat	Lease, for three lives, of 1.5 hides at Ditchford in Blockley, Gloucestershire, with reversion to the bishopric of Worcester.	English, Worcester	
1410	168		A.D. 744 (10 July)	Lulla, handmaid of Christ	Glastonbury Abbey	Grant of 10 hides (manentes) at Baltonsborough, Somerset, and at Scobbanwirht' with mention of land at Lottisham and Lydford, Somerset, placed at King Æthelbald's disposal.	Latin with bounds, Glastonbury	
1411	220		A.D. 757 x 774	Ceolfrith, abbot	the church of St Peter, Worcester, and the bishopric of Worcester	Grant of 20 hides (manentes) at Henbury, Gloucestershire, and 14 (cassati) at Sture in the province of Ismere, Worcestershire	Latin, Worcester	
1412	271		A.D. 786 x 796	Beonna, abbot of Medeshamstede	Cuthbert, princeps	Lease of 10 hides (manentes) at Swineshead, Lincolnshire, in return for 1000 shillings and annual hospitality (unius noctis pastum) valued at 30 sicli, with ultimate reversion to Medeshamstede.	Latin, Peterborough	
1413	283		? A.D. 781 x 800	Headda, priest and abbot	his descendants in priestly orders, with reversion to the bishopric of Worcester	Grant of land at Dowdeswell, Gloucestershire; Tyreltune (? Whittington, Gloucestershire); and at Onnandune (near Andoversford, Gloucestershire).	Latin, Worcester	
1414	402		A.D. 830 for 832 or after	Werhard, presbiter	Christ Church, Canterbury	Bequest of land comprising 104 hides at Harrow, Middlesex; 100 at Otford, 32 at Graveney, 44 at Burnan (? Bishopsbourne), 10 at Easole, 36 at Barham, Kent; and 1 iugum at Lambahamm by the river Lympne, 1 iugum at Northuuda, and 1 mansio at Canterbury [all of which had previously belonged to his kinsman, Archbishop Wulfred]; also 32 hides at Hayes, Middlesex, land at Megeldewrthe, 8 hides at Cuniland and 30 hides at Twickenham, Middlesex [from his own patrimony].	Latin, Canterbury, Christ Church	
1415	559		A.D. 889			With the permission of the familia in the church of Worcester, arranges for himself a lease, for three lives, of 5 hides (manentes) at Elmstone Hardwicke, Gloucestershire, formerly belonging to the minster at Bishop's Cleeve, with reversion to the church of Worcester.	Latin, Worcester	
1416	570		A.D. 892			With the agreement of the familia at Worcester, arranges for himself the lease, for four lives, of 3 hides (manentes) at South Hethfeld and of land at Hreodhalh.	Latin with English, Worcester	
1417	648		A.D. 924 x 933	The familia of New Minster, Winchester	Alfred, minister of King Athelstan	Lease, for three lives, of 20 hides (cassati) at Chisledon, Wiltshire, in return for 80 mancuses of gold and an annual rent of 80 shillings.	Latin, Winchester, New Minster	
1418	804		A.D. 946 x 953	Æthelnoth, priest	New Minster, Winchester	Grant of land at Basing, Hampshire, and elsewhere, which he had been given by King Edmund.	Old English, Middle English and Latin versions, Winchester, New Minster	
1419	825		A.D. 947 x 955	Eadwulf, mæsse preost	New Minster and to Nunnaminster, Winchester	Grant of 10 hides at Leckford, Hampshire [given to Eadwulf by King Eadred], each beneficiary receiving 5 hides.	Old English, Middle English and Latin versions, Winchester, New Minster	
1420			A.D. 995 x 1005	Ælfsige, abbot, and the community of New Minster, Winchester	Wulfmær	Lease, for his life and his wife's, of one hide at Barton Stacey, with reversion of this and a further hide at Drayton, Hampshire, to the minster.	Old English, Middle English and Latin versions, Winchester, New Minster	
1421	1318		s. xi1		Fulder	Lease, for three years,of land at Luddington, Warwickshire, in return for the three pounds that he had lent.	English, Worcester	
1422		1302	A.D. 1007 x 1014		Edmund the Ætheling	Lease, for life, of land at Holcombe Rogus, Devon, in return for 20 pounds.	English, Sherborne	
1423			A.D. 1016 x 1023	Ælfweard, abbot of Evesham and the community at Evesham	Æthelmær	Lease, for three lives, of 4.5 hides at Norton, Worcestershire, with reversion to the abbey.	English, Worcester	
1424		1317	A.D. 1022	Eadric, abbot in Ealdanhamme (St Peter's, Gloucester)	Stanmarcotus	Lease, for life, of land at Hatherley and Badgeworth, Gloucestershire, in return for 15 pounds towards the heregeld.	Latin, Gloucester, St Peter's	
1425		950	A.D. 1049 x 1052	Leofstan, abbot, and St Albans Abbey	Tova, widow of Wihtric, in return for 3 marks of gold and an annual render of honey	Lease, for her lifetime and that of her son, Godwine, of land at Cyrictiwa (Great Tew, Oxfordshire), with reversion to St Albans.	English and Latin versions, St Albans	
1426	929		A.D. 1061 x 1065	Ælfwig, abbot, and the community at Bath	Stigand, archbishop	Lease, for life, of 30 hides at Tidenham, Gloucestershire, in return for 10 marks of gold and 20 pounds of silver, with reversion to the abbey. The lessee is to pay an annual render of one mark of gold, 6 porpoises and thirty thousand herring.	English, Bath	
1427		821	A.D. 1061 x 1082, possibly 1061 x 1066			Writ of Abbot Wulfwold; announcing that he has given to St Peter's minster at Bath land at Evesty (lost, cf. S 692) and Ashwick, Somerset.	English, Bath	
1428		922	Domesday.			Writ of the monk Edwin,; child-master at New Minster, Winchester, concerning an agreement between Old and New Minster.	English, Winchester, Old Minster and Winchester, New Minster	
1428a			A.D. 680			Decree of Archbishop Theodore respecting the division of the bishoprics.	Latin, Winchester, Old Minster	
1428b			A.D. 704 x 705			Letter of Waldhere, bishop of London, to Brihtwold, archbishop of Canterbury, concerning a dispute which had arisen between the king of the West Saxons and the rulers of the East Saxons.	Latin, Canterbury, Christ Church	
1429	156		A.D. 736 x 737			Decree of a synod under Archbishop Nothhelm concerning the succession of a monastery (at Withington, Gloucestershire) built on 20 hides (cassati) by the river Tillath (Coln) given for the purpose by Æthelred, king of Mercia.	Latin, Worcester	
1430	256		A.D. 789 (Chelsea, Middx)			Settlement of a dispute between Heathored, bishop, and Wulfheard, son of Cussa,; concerning land at Inkberrow and Bradley, Worcestershire	Latin, Worcester	
1430a			A.D. 798			Decree of a council of Bapchild, Kent, concerning the liberties of the Church.	Latin, Canterbury, Christ Church	
1431	309		A.D. 803 (Clofesho)			Record of an agreement between Deneberht, bishop of Worcester, and Wulfheard, bishop of Hereford,; concerning their claims to the minsters at Cheltenham and Beckford, Gloucestershire	Latin, Worcester	
1431a			A.D. 803			Decree of a council of Clofesho concerning the restoration of the metropolitan rights of the see of Canterbury and the abolition of the archbishopric of Lichfield.	Latin, Canterbury, Christ Church	
1431b			A.D. 803			Decree of a council of Clofesho concerning the lordship of minsters.	Latin, Canterbury, Christ Church	
1432	308 d		After A.D. 822 x 823			Memorandum concerning King Ceolwulf's request for land at Bromsgrove, Worcestershire,; from Bishop Heahberht and his community, and a consequent attempt by Wulfheard to obtain possession of Inkberrow, Worcestershire	English, Worcester	
1433	379		A.D. 824 (Clofesho, 30 Oct)			Record of the settlement of a dispute between Heahberht, bishop, and the familia at Berkeley, Gloucestershire,; concerning land at Westbury-on-Trym, Gloucestershire	Latin, Worcester	
1434	378		A.D. 824 (Clofesho)			Record of the recovery by Archbishop Wulfred; of land at Easole, Kent, granted to him by Ealdberht, comes, and Selethryth, his sister, but fraudulently acquired by Cwoenthryth, abbess of Minster-in-Thanet, Kent. Endorsed with bounds, in English, of Godmersham (cf. CCC 13, S 1620) and Challock, Kent.	Latin with English bounds, Canterbury, Christ Church	
1435	387		A.D. 825 (Clofesho)			Record of a synodal dispute-settlement, concerning the recovery by Coenred, bishop of Selsey,; of land at Denton, Sussex.	Latin, Selsey	
1436	384		A.D. 825 for circa 827 (Clofesho)			Record of a dispute between Archbishop Wulfred and Coenwulf, king of Mercia, and his heir Cwoenthryth, abbess, concerning the minsters of Reculver and Minster-in-Thanet, Kent. At an initial settlement in London (? late 821) Wulfred ceded to King Coenwulf 300 hides at Iognes homme (? Eynsham, Oxfordshire). In subsequent settlements (at Clofesho and Oslafeshlau) Cwoenthryth ceded to Wulfred land at Harrow, Middlesex; Herefrethingland; Wembley, Yeading, Middlesex; Boc land; and Combe, Kent.	Latin, Canterbury, Christ Church	
1437	386		A.D. 825 (Clofesho)			Record of the settlement of a dispute concerning swine-pasture at Sinton in Leigh, Worcestershire	English, Worcester	
1438	421		A.D. 838 (Kingston-on-Thames, Surrey)			Record of the agreement made at Kingston, between Archbishop Ceolnoth and Kings Egbert and Æthelwulf concerning the restoration to Christ Church, Canterbury, of land at Mallingum (East Malling, Kent or South Malling, Sussex), previously granted by Baldred, king of Kent. In return Ceolnoth and the Christ Church community and their successors promise loyalty to the West Saxon kings and their heirs. An additional passage concerns an agreement over the election of abbots and abbesses to the Kentish minsters. Confirmations by King Æthelwulf (at a meeting at Wilton) and (A.D. 839) by bishops south of the Humber, at a synod æt Astran.	Latin, Canterbury, Christ Church	
1439	445		A.D. 844 (Canterbury)			Account of the settlement of a dispute concerning estates belonging to Oswulf, dux, bequeathed by him in reversion to the Church and now held by the Kentish monasteries of Christ Church, Folkestone, Dover and Lyminge. They are claimed by a certain Æthelwulf, but the rights of the churches are upheld.	Latin, Canterbury, Christ Church	
1440	464		A.D. 852			Agreement between Abbot Ceolred and the community at Medeshamstede, and Wulfred, concerning land at Sempringham, Sleaford, Lincolnshire; Forde; Cheal, Lincolnshire; and at Lehcotum.	English, Peterborough	
1441	574		A.D. 896 (Gloucester)			Record of an agreement between Wærferth, bishop of Worcester, and Æthelwold concerning woodland at Woodchester, Bisley, Avening, Gloucestershire; and at Scorranstone (? Sherston, Wiltshire) and Thornbyrig (? Thornbury, Gloucestershire) and swine-pasture at Longridge, Gloucestershire	English with bounds, Worcester	
1442	575		A.D. 897			Settlement of a dispute between the churches of Winchcombe and Worcester concerning land at Upton in Blockley, Gloucestershire	Latin, Worcester	
1443	605		circa A.D. 900			Record of the acquisition by King Edward from Bishop Denewulf and the community at Winchester, in exchange for St Andrew's church, of land at Winchester for the foundation of a monastery; also of the acquisition by the king of land by St Gregory's church.	English with bounds, Winchester, Old Minster and Winchester, New Minster	
1444	618		A.D. 900 x 908			Letter of Denewulf, bishop, to King Edward concerning 60 hides at Beddington, Surrey.	Latin and English versions, Winchester, Old Minster	
1445	591		A.D. 899 x 924			Letter to King Edward explaining the history of land at Fonthill.	English, Canterbury, Christ Church	
1446	582		circa A.D. 903			Settlement of a dispute between Wærferth, bishop, and Eadnoth, concerning land at Sodbury, Gloucestershire	English, Worcester	
1446a			s. x1			Notification by Æthelweard to Ceolberht that he should render two portions of the tithe from Bedwyn and from Lambourne to God's servants at (Great) Bedwyn, Wiltshire	English, Bedwyn	
1447	1063		circa A.D. 950-68			Record of a dispute involving estates at Send, Surrey, and at Sunbury, Middlesex, and a note of their purchase by Dunstan, archbishop.	English, Westminster	
1448	1128		? A.D. 963	Æthelwold, bishop	St Peter's, Medeshamstede (Peterborough)	Record of gifts including land at Medeshamstede, Anlafestun; at Farcet and Whittlesey Mere, Huntingdonshire; at Oundle and Kettering, Northamptonshire; and at Well (cf. Outwell, Upwell, Welney, Cambridgeshire and Norfolk); tithe from the double hundreds of Normancross, Huntingdonshire, and of Nassaborough, Northamptonshire, and from Maxey, Ashton, Nunton and Pilsgate in Barnack, Northamptonshire; with stock at Yaxley, Huntingdonshire	English, Peterborough	
1448a			A.D. 983 x 985			List of sureties for estates of Peterborough Abbey, relating to land at Warmington, Benefield, Walton, Maxey, Castor, Wittering, Ashton, Oxney in Peterborough, Longthorp, Bainton, Northamptonshire; Anlafestune; Lutton, Northamptonshire	English, Peterborough	
1449	1163		A.D. 964 x 975 (? 970 x 975)			Record of adjustment of the boundaries between the monasteries in Winchester.	English, Winchester, Old Minster	
1450	1351		(1) A.D. 951 (? for 959)		the church of St Peter, Westminster	Restoration of 5 hides (mansiunculae) on the north side of the river Thames between the Tyburn and the Fleet, Middlesex, with an additional grant of 5 hides at Blecceanham (Blechenham, lost, in Hendon). (2) A.D. 972 (Kingston-on-Thames, Surrey). King Edgar to St Peter's; grant of 6 hides (cassati) at Lohtheres leage (lost, in Hendon, Middlesex), purchased by Archbishop Dunstan from Edgar for 70 gold solidi and previously in the possession of Wulfmær. (3) A.D. 978. Dunstan, archbishop of Canterbury, purchases for thirty pounds a further 3 hides at Lotheres leage, previously held by Brihtferth, huntsman, and grants the estate to St Peter's, Westminster. (4) A.D. 986. King Æthelred to the church of Westminster; grant of 5 hides (mansiunculae) at Hampstead, Middlesex	Latin with bounds, Westminster	
1451a			s. x2			Account of the consecration in 905 of seven bishops (for Winchester, Ramsbury, Sherborne, Wells, Crediton, Selsey and Dorchester), and statement of the assignment to Crediton, on that occasion, of land at Pawton in St Breock, Cællincg and Lawhitton, Cornwall.	Latin, Canterbury, Christ Church; Winchester, Old Minster; Exeter	
1452	1244		circa A.D. 968 x 993			List of sureties between Eadgifu, abbess, and Leofric, abbot, for land at Stoke Canon, Devon.	English, Exeter	
1453	1278		A.D. 972 x 992			Archbishop Oswald's memoranda on the estates of the see of York.	English	
1454		693	A.D. 990 x 992			Record of a dispute between Wynflæd and Leofwine about land at Hagbourne and Bradfield, Berkshire, and at Datchet, Buckinghamshire, which was settled at the shire-moot at Cwicelmshlæwe (Scutchamer Knob, Berkshire).	English, Canterbury, Christ Church	
1455		429	circa A.D. 990 x 1005			Agreement between Wulfric, abbot of St Augustine's, Canterbury, and Ealdred, son of Lyfing, about land at Clife, Kent.	English, Canterbury, St Augustine's	
1456		929	A.D. 995 x 1005			An account of the settlement of a dispute between Godwine, bishop of Rochester, and Leofwine, son of Ælfheah, concerning land at Snodland, Kent.	English, Rochester	
1457	1296		? A.D. 980 x 987			Account of the acquisition by the bishop of Rochester, on behalf of St Andrew's church, of land at Bromley and Fawkham, Kent, in compensation for the theft of the title-deeds of Snodland, Kent.	English, Rochester	
1458	1097		circa A.D. 995			Account of Archbishop Dunstan's acquisition of 6 sulungs at Wouldham, Kent, on behalf of St Andrew's, Rochester; including details of the history of estates at Erith, Cray and Eynesford, Kent.	English and Latin versions, Rochester	
1458a			circa A.D. 1000			List of the contributions of men required for manning a ship from estates belonging to the bishopric of London. The places named are: St Osyth, Tillingham, Dunmow, Tolleshunt, Navestock, Essex; Neasden, Middlesex; Wickham St Paul's, Essex; Tollington, Hungerdown, Bromley (by Bow), Tottenham Court, Clapham (? or Clapton), Middlesex; Barnes, Surrey; Chiswick, Drayton, Middlesex; Caddington, Sandon, Hertfordshire; Ceaddingtune; Fulham, Middlesex; Forthtune (? Fortune Gate in Harlesden, Middlesex); Stepney, Islington, Middlesex; Orsett, Laindon, Shopland, (West) Orsett, Belchamp St Paul's, Copford, Holland, Southminster, Clacton, Hadleigh and Codham (Hall in Warley), Essex.	English, London, St Paul's	
1459		738	A.D. 1014 x 1023 (? 1017)			Marriage agreement whereby Wulfric, on marrying the sister of Archbishop Wulfstan, promises her land at Orleton and Ribblesford, Worcestershire, for her life, undertakes to obtain for her from the community at Worcester a lease, for three lives, of land at Knightwick, Worcestershire, and settles on her land at Alton in Rock, Worcestershire	English, Worcester	
1460		898	circa A.D. 1010 x 1023 (? 1023)			Record of a dispute between Athelstan, bishop (of Hereford) and Wulfstan and his son Wulfric, concerning land at Inkberrow, Worcestershire	English, Worcester	
1461		732	A.D. 1016 x 1020			Marriage agreement between Godwine and Brihtric including grant to Brihtric's daughter of land at Street and at Burmarsh, Kent.	English, Canterbury, Christ Church	
1461a			circa A.D. 1020			Survey of the estates at Sherburn-in-Elmet, Otley and Ripon, Yorkshire, belonging to the see of York.	English	
1462		755	A.D. 1016 x 1035			Account of a dispute between Edwin, son of Enniaun, and his mother, concerning land at Wellington and Crydesleah (? lost in Briley), Herefordshire	English, Hereford	
1462a			circa A.D. 1017 x 1027 (Lichfield)			Declaration that Godwine, son of Earwig, has been cleared of the accusation of unrihtwife brought by Leofgar, bishop [of Lichfield].	English, Lichfield	
1463		733	A.D. 1020 x 1023 (London)			Record of the acquisition by Ælfsige, abbot of Peterborough, on behalf of the abbey, of fenland at Whittlesey Mere, Huntingdonshire, from Thored, in exchange for land at Orton, Huntingdonshire, and a sum of money.	Latin with bounds, Peterborough	
1464		1321	A.D. 1020 x 1038 (Monks Risborough, Bucks)			Agreement between Archbishop Æthelnoth and Toki concerning land at Halton, Buckinghamshire, bequeathed to Christ Church by Wulfnoth.	English, Canterbury, Christ Church	
1465		745	A.D. 1032 or 1035			Declaration of arrangements made between Eadsige, priest, and Christ Church concerning land at Appledore, Warehorne, Berwick, Orpington, Palster and Wittersham, Kent.	English, Canterbury, Christ Church	
1466		1336	A.D. 1038 x 1050			Agreement between Archbishop Eadsige and Toki, confirming arrangements made in the time of Archbishop Æthelnoth about land at Halton, Buckinghamshire (cf. S 1464).	English, Canterbury, Christ Church	
1467		758	After A.D. 1037 x 1040			Account of the restoration of Sandwich to Christ Church, Canterbury, by King Harold, and of a dispute between Christ Church and St Augustine's, Canterbury, concerning Sandwich.	English, Canterbury, Christ Church	
1468			A.D. 1043 x 1044			Agreement between Æthelmær and Ufi, abbot of Bury St Edmunds, and the community there concerning land at Swanton and Hindolveston, Norfolk.	English, Bury St Edmunds	
1469		802	A.D. 1043 x 1046			Memorandum that Leofwine, brother of Leofflæd, has purchased from Eadric, son of Ufic, a half hide at Mansell, Herefordshire, for half a mark of gold, a pound of silver and two ores.	English, Hereford	
1470		1340	A.D. 1043 x 1047			Agreement between the abbey and community of Bury St Edmunds, and Wulfgeat and his wife, concerning land at Gislingham, Suffolk, and Fakenham, Norfolk.	English, Bury St Edmunds	
1471		773	circa A.D. 1045			Agreement between Archbishop Eadsige and Æthelric concerning land at Chart, Stowting, Milton and a haga in Canterbury, all in Kent. The land at Chart had been purchased by Archbishop Ceolnoth wth his own money from the thegn Hæletha and granted to him by charter by Æthelwulf, king of Wessex (A.D. 839 x 856, cf. CCC 18, S 1625).	Old and Middle English versions, Canterbury, Christ Church	
1472		790	A.D. 1044 x 1045			Record of the settlement of a dispute over St Mildrith's property between Ælfstan, abbot of St Augustine's, and Leofwine, priest. Leofwine gives up his claim in return for an annual payment of five pounds and a life-interest in 1 sulung at Langdon and 1 at Ileden, Kent, to revert to St Augustine's after his death.	English, Canterbury, Christ Church	
1473		789	A.D. 1044 x 1048			Account of the purchase of land at Offham, Kent, by Godric of Bourne from his sister, Eadgifu.	English, Canterbury, Christ Church	
1474		1334	A.D. 1045 x 1046			Agreement between Bishop Ælfwold and the community at Sherborne, and Care, son of Toki, concerning land at Holcombe Rogus, Devon.	English, Sherborne	
1475		807	A.D. 1051 x 1053			Declaration that Æthelwine, dean of Worcester, and Ordric, his brother, purchased 3 hides (cassati) at Condicote, Gloucestershire, and restored it to the monastery at Worcester.	Latin, Worcester	
1476	980		circa A.D. 1053			Agreement between Bishop Stigand, the community at Old Minster, Winchester, and Wulfweard the White concerning 10 hides in Hayling Island, Hampshire	English, Winchester, Old Minster	
1477		844	A.D. 1052 x 1066			Notification by King Edward that he has restored to Chertsey Abbey 10 hides at White Waltham, Berkshire, with the church there, woodland at Halewik (Hollicks, lost, in White Waltham) and Lidlegewik (Littlewick in White Waltham) and 20 acres of meadow at Cookham, Berkshire	English, Chertsey	
1478		956	A.D. 1053 x 1055 (? Lincoln)			Agreement between Bishop Wulfwig, and Earl Leofric and Godgifu, his wife, concerning the endowment of a monastery at Stowe St Mary, Lincolnshire	English, Eynsham	
1479		964	A.D. 1058 x 1062			Declaration by Ælfgar, dux, that Ordwig, father of Abbot Æthelwig, gave to Evesham Abbey land at Acton Beauchamp, Herefordshire, and at Dorsington, Warwickshire	Latin, Evesham	
1480		823	A.D. 1062 x 1066			Declaration that Ealdred, archbishop, has purchased 10 hides (cassati) at Hampnett, Gloucestershire, and granted it to St Mary's, Worcester.	Latin, Worcester	
1481		927	A.D. 1042 x 1055			History of land at Ryhall and Belmesthorpe, Rutland, claimed by Peterborough Abbey.	Latin, Peterborough	
1481a			circa 1055.			Record of the settlement of a dispute between Ælfwine, abbot of Ramsey, and Leofric, abbot of Peterborough (then in charge of Thorney), with Siward, provost of Thorney, concerning the boundaries at King's Delph, Northamptonshire	English, Ramsey, Thorney	
1481b			s. xi2			Agreement between Brihtric, with his wife (gebedde), and the canons of St Paul's, London.	English, London, St Paul's	
1481c			s. xi2			Agreement between Æthelweard and the dean and brothers of St Paul's, London, concerning land at Sandon, Hertfordshire	English, London, St Paul's	
1481d			? s. xi1			List of estates liable for work on Rochester bridge. The places named are: Borstal, Cuxton, Frindsbury, Stoke, Gillingham, Chatham, Halling, Trottiscliffe, Malling, (South) Fleet, Stone, Pinden, Fawkham, Aylesford, Overhill (in Boxley), Oakley, Cossington, Dowdes, Gisleardesland, Wouldham, Burham, Eccles, Horsted, Farleigh, Teston, Chalk, Henhurst, Haven, Wrotham, Maidstone, Wateringbury, Nettlestead, the two Peckhams, Hadlow, Mereworth, Leybourne, Swanton, Offham, Ditton, Westerham, Hollingbourne, Hoo, Northfleet, Bishops Cliffe, Higham, Denton, Milton, Luddesdown, Meopham, Snodland, Birling and Paddlesworth, all in Kent.	English, Rochester	
1481e			circa A.D. 1000			List of serfs belonging to Hatfield, Hertfordshire	English, probably Ely	
1482	412		A.D. 833 x 839			Will of Abba, reeve, concerning his property (the only named land being at Chillenden, Kent); with endorsement detailing the arrangements made by Heregyth, his wife, for an annual render to Christ Church, Canterbury, from an estate at Challock, Kent.	English, Canterbury, Christ Church	
1483	1012		A.D. 946 x circa 951			Will of Ælfgar, including bequests of land at Cockfield, Suffolk; Fen Ditton, Cambridgeshire; Lavenham, Suffolk; Baythorne, Essex; Monks Eleigh, Suffolk; Colne, Tey, Peldon, (West) Mersea, Greenstead, Tidwoldingstone (Heybridge near Maldon) and Totham, Essex; Ashfield and Rushbrook, Suffolk; the beneficiaries including St Edmunds, Bedericesworth; the community at Stoke (probably Stoke-by-Nayland, Suffolk); St Mary's, Barking; Christ Church, Canterbury; and St Paul's, London.	English, Bury St Edmunds	
1484		721	A.D. 966 x 975			Will of Ælfgifu, including bequests of land at Princes Risborough, Buckinghamshire, to Old Minster, Winchester; at Bledlow, Buckinghamshire, to New Minster, Winchester; at Whaddon, Buckinghamshire, to Romsey Abbey; at Chesham, Buckinghamshire, to Abingdon and at Wicham to Bath; also at Wing, Linslade and Haversham, Buckinghamshire, Hatfield (? Hertfordshire), Masworth, Buckinghamshire, and at Gussage (All Saints), Dorset, to the king; at Newnham Murren, Oxon, to the ætheling; at Tæafersceat to Bishop Æthelwold; at Mongewell, Oxfordshire, and at Berkhampstead, Hertfordshire, to Ælfweard, Æthelweard and Ælfwaru in common, for life, with reversion to Old Minster, Winchester.	English, Winchester, Old Minster	
1485	1174		circa A.D. 968 x 971			Will of Ælfheah, ealdorman, including bequests of land at Wroughton, Wiltshire, to God (or King Edgar); at Crondall, Hampshire, to Old Minster, Winchester; at Charlton, Wiltshire, to Malmesbury Abbey and at Sutton (? Somerset) to Bath Abbey; also land at Worth (probably Littleworth in Faringdon), Cookham and Thatcham, Berkshire; Chelworth, Wiltshire; Incgenæsham (? Inglesham, Wiltshire); Aylesbury and Wendover, Buckinghamshire, to King Edgar; land at Scyræburnan to Queen Ælfthryth; at Walkhampstead (now Godstone), Surrey, to Æthelred, Edgar's son; land at Faringdon, Berkshire, and Aldbourne, Wiltshire, to Ælfhere, his brother; land at Tudincgatun (? Teddington, Middlesex) to Godwine, his son; at Wyritunæ (? Purton, Wiltshire) to Ælfweard; at Wycombe, Buckinghamshire, to Æthelweard, his kinsman; and at Froxfield, Hampshire, to Ælfwine, his nephew; also land at Batcombe, Somerset, to Ælfswyth, his wife, with ultimate reversion to Glastonbury Abbey.	English, Winchester, Old Minster	
1486	1289		A.D. 1000 x 1002			Will of Ælfflæd, including bequests of land at Dovercourt, Fulanpettæ (Beaumont), Alresford, Stanway, Byrton in Stanway (lost), Lexden, Essex; Elmsett and Buxhall, Suffolk, to the king; at Stoke, Suffolk; Hatfield (? Peverel, Essex), Stratford St Mary, Freston, Wiston, Lavenham, Balsdon, Polstead, Withermarsh, Suffolk; Greenstead (near Colchester), Peldon, (West) Mersea, Totham, Colne and Tey, Essex, to Stoke (? Stoke-by-Nayland, Suffolk); and at Monks Eleigh, Suffolk, to Christ Church, Canterbury; at Hadham, Hertfordshire, and at Tidwoldingtune (Heybridge near Maldon, Essex) to St Paul's, London; and at Baythorn, Essex, to Barking Abbey; at Woodham, Essex, to Ælfthryth, the king's mother, for life, with reversion to St Mary's, Barking; at Chelsworth and Cockfield, Suffolk, to St Edmund's Abbey; and at Nedging, Suffolk, to the same after the death of Crawe, her kinswoman; at Fingringhoe and Mersea, Essex, to the minster at Mersea; at Waldingfield, Suffolk, to St Gregory's, Sudbury, after the death of Crawe; at Rettendon, Essex; Soham, Ditton and Cheveley, Cambridgeshire, to Ely Abbey; at Lawling, Essex, to Ealdorman Æthelmær; and at Liston, Essex, to Æthelmær. With bounds of Balsdon, Withermarsh and Polstead appended.	English with bounds, Bury St Edmunds	
1487	1306		A.D. 975 x 1016			Will of Ælfhelm (Polga), including bequests of land at Wratting, Cambridgeshire, to Ely Abbey; at Brickendon, Hertfordshire, to Westminster Abbey; at Whepstead, Suffolk, and Walton (perhaps near Felixstowe, Suffolk), to his son Ælfgar; and at Baddow and Burstead, Essex, at Stratford, (probably Stratford St Mary, Suffolk), at Enhale and Wilbraham, Cambridgeshire, at Rayne, Essex, at Carlton, Cambridgeshire, and at Gestingthorpe, Essex, to his wife; at Gestingthorpe, Essex, to Godric and Ælfhelm's daughter; at Conington, Cambridgeshire, to his wife and daughter, and to Æthelric, Ælfwold and Osmær; also at Cockayne Hatley and Potton, Bedfordshire, to Ælfmær, Ælfstan and Osgar; at Littlebury (near Saffron Walden), Essex, to Leofsige, and at Great Staughton, Huntingdonshire, to Leofsige and his wife; also at Troston, Suffolk, to his three brothers and Ælfwold; at Ickleton, Cambridgeshire, and Mawyrthe to Ælfhelm; and at Barnham (probably Suffolk), to Wulfmær.	English, Westminster	
1488		716	A.D. 1002 x 1005			Will of Ælfric, archbishop, including bequests of land at Westwell and Burnan (? Bishopsbourne), Kent, and Monks Risborough, Buckinghamshire, to Christ Church; at Cingesbyrig (probably consisting of land at Flamstead, Hertfordshire, and at St Albans) to St Albans Abbey; at Dumbleton, Gloucestershire, part to Abingdon Abbey and part to Ælfnoth, for life, with reversion to Abingdon; at Wallingford, Berkshire, to Ceolweard, for life, with reversion to Cholsey minster; at (Great) Tew and Osney, Oxfordshire, and at London to St Albans; at Fiddington and at Newton (in Ashchurch), Gloucestershire, to his sisters and their children.	Latin and English versions, Abingdon	
1489		759	A.D. 1023 x 1038			Will of Ælfric, bishop (of Elmham), including bequests of land at Worlingworth, Suffolk, and at Hunstanton, Holme, Tichwell and Docking, Norfolk, to Bury St Edmunds; at Grimston, Norfolk, to Leofstan, the dean; and instructions to sell land at Walsingham and Fersfield, Norfolk; also bequests of land at Egmere, Norfolk, part to Ælfwine and part to Ufi, the prior; the mill at Guist, Norfolk, to Edwin, the monk; land at Roydon, Norfolk, to Ælfwig, the priest; and at Moulton (probably Suffolk) to Sibriht; also a messuage in Norwich to St Edmunds and one in London to St Peter's.	English, Bury St Edmunds	
1490		970	Probably A.D. 1042 x 1043			Will of Ælfric Modercope, including bequests of land at Thurwineholm and Loddon, Norfolk, to (Bury) St Edmunds; at Bergh Apton, Norfolk, with Fuglholm to St Etheldreda's (Ely); at Barton Turf, Norfolk, to St Benedict's, Holme.	English, Bury St Edmunds	
1491	652		A.D. 955 x 958			Will of Ælfsige, bishop (of Winchester), concerning land at Taunton, Somerset; Crondall, Abbots Ann, the two Worthys (possibly Kings Worthy and Martyr Worthy), Clere (Burghclere or Highclere), Tichborne, Ringwood, all in Hampshire, the beneficiaries including the king and Old and New Minsters, Winchester.	Old English, Middle English and Latin versions, Winchester, New Minster	
1492			A.D. 1008 x 1012			Will of Ælfwold, bishop (of Crediton), including bequests of land at Sandford, Devon, to the monastery at Crediton and to Godric.	English, Exeter (ex Crediton)	
1493		971	A.D. 978 x 1016	Ærnketel and Wulfrun, his wife	St Benedict, Ramsey	Bequest of land at Hickling and Kinoulton, Nottinghamshire, and at Lockington, Yorkshire	Latin, Ramsey	
1494	1288		A.D. 962 x 991, probably after 975			Will of Æthelflæd, including bequest of land at Lambourn, Cholsey and Reading, Berkshire, to the king; at Damerham, Hampshire, to Glastonbury; at Hamme to Christ Church, Canterbury; at Woodham, Essex, to Ealdorman Brihtnoth and her sister for life, with reversion to St Mary's, Barking; at Hadham, Hertfordshire, to the same, for life, with reversion to St Paul's, London; at Fen Ditton, Cambridgeshire, to Ely Abbey; at Cockfield and Chelsworth, Suffolk, to the same for life, with reversion to St Edmunds, Bedericesworth (Bury); at Fingringhoe, Essex, to the same for life, with reversion to St Peter's, Mersea; at Polstead, Suffolk, to the same for life, with reversion to Stoke (? Stoke-by-Nayland, Suffolk); at Withermarsh, Suffolk, to Stoke; at Stratford St Mary, Lavenham, Balsdon, Suffolk, and at Peldon, Mersea and Greenstead (near Colchester), Essex, to Ealdorman Brihtnoth and her sister for life, with reversion to Stoke; at Elmsett, Suffolk, to the same for life, with reversion to Edmund; at Thorpe (? Morieux, Suffolk), to Hadleigh, Suffolk; at Wickford, Essex, to Sibriht, her kinsman; at Hadham, Hertfordshire, to Ecgwine, her reeve; at Donyland, Essex, to Brihtwold, her servant, to Ælfwold and Æthelmær, her priests, and to Ælfgeat, her kinsman; and at Waldingfield, Suffolk, to Crawe, her kinswoman.	English, Bury St Edmunds	
1495		972	s. x/xi		St Paul's minster, London	Bequest of land at Laver, Essex, and at Cockhampstead, Hertfordshire	English, London, St Paul's	
1496	989		A.D. 957 x circa 958		his wife, for her lifetime	Bequest of Sotwell, Berkshire, with reversion to New Minster, Winchester.	Old English, Middle English and Latin versions, Winchester, New Minster	
1497	812		circa A.D. 990 x 1001			Will of Æthelgifu, including bequests of land at Westwick (in St Albans), Gaddesden, Hertfordshire; Langford, Clifton, Bedfordshire; Munden, Standon, Offley, Tewin, Hertfordshire; Weedon, Buckinghamshire; London; Watford, Hertfordshire; and Thrope; the beneficiaries including St Albans Abbey and (? the churches of) Hitchin, Braughing and Welwyn, Hertfordshire	Latin and English versions with English bounds, St Albans	
1498			A.D. 977 x 982			Will of Æthelmær, ealdorman, including bequests of 13 hides previously held by Lufa, to New Minster, Winchester; of land at Tidworth, Hampshire, to his wife, with reversion to New Minster; and of land at Igeneshamme (? Inglesham, Wiltshire or Eynsham, Oxfordshire) and Cottesmore (lost, in Broadwell, Oxfordshire) to his sons.	Old English, Middle English and Latin versions, Winchester, New Minster	
1499			A.D. 1047 x 1070	Æthelmær, bishop (of Elmham)	(Bury) St Edmunds	Bequest of land at Hindringham, Langham, Hindolveston and Swanton Novers, Norfolk.	English, Bury St Edmunds	
1500	318 d		A.D. 805 x 832			Will of Æthelnoth, reeve at Eastry, and Gænburg, his wife, concerning arrangements for the disposition of land at Eythorne, Kent.	English, Canterbury, Christ Church	
1501		699	circa A.D. 960 x 994			Will of Æthelric, including bequest of all his land to his wife, with reversions as follows; land at Bocking, Essex, part to Christ Church and part to the church at Bocking; at Rayne, Essex, to St Paul's, London; at Copford and Glazenwood in Bradwell, Essex, to Ælfstan, bishop (of London); at Northho, part to St Gregory's, Sudbury, and part to St Edmunds at Bedericesworth (Bury).	English, Canterbury, Christ Church, and Bury St Edmunds	
1502		1338	A.D. 1048 x 1050		St Augustine's	Bequest of land at Bodsham and Wilderton, Kent, to take effect after the death of the present tenants.	Latin, Canterbury, St Augustine's	
1503		722	A.D. 1014			Will of the Ætheling Æthelstan, including bequests of land at Adderbury, Oxfordshire, Marlow, Buckinghamshire, and (Steeple) Morden, Cambridgeshire, to Old Minster, Winchester; at Hollingbourne and Garrington in Littlebourne, Kent, to Christ Church, Canterbury; at Rotherfield (? Sussex) to Nunnaminster, Winchester; at Chalton, Hampshire, Northtune and at Mollington, Oxfordshire, to King Æthelred; land in East Anglia and Peacesdele (? Peak District or Pegsdon, Bedfordshire) to Edmund, his brother; at Hambleden, Buckinghamshire, to Ælfmær; at Cumtune to Godwine; at Westune to Ælfswith; at Heorulfestune to Ælfwine; at Catherington, Hampshire, to Ælfmær; at Hockcliffe, Bedfordshire, to Siferth; at Tewin, Hertfordshire, to Æthelweard the Stammerer and to Lyfing; at Lutegaresheale (? Ludgershall, Wiltshire), to Godwine the Driveller.	English, Canterbury, Christ Church, and Winchester, Old Minster	
1503a			? A.D. 986			Will of Æthelstan Mannessune, including bequests of land at Chatteris, Cambridgeshire, to Ramsey abbey, and at Wold (near Witchford), Cambridgeshire, to Ely abbey; at Clapham, Bedfordshire Graveley, Cambridgeshire Waresley, Huntingdonshire and Elsworth, Cambridgeshire, to his wife for her lifetime, with reversion to Ramsey abbey; half the land at Knapwell, Cambridgeshire, to his wife, and half to Leofsige, his kinsman; land at Over, Cambridgeshire, and Holywell, Huntingdonshire, to his wife; at Cottenham, Cambridgeshire, to his son; at Great Gransden, Cambridgeshire, to his elder daughter; 2 hides at Hatley, Cambridgeshire, to his sister; land at Slepe (St Ives, Huntingdonshire) and at Hackthorn, Lincolnshire, to his younger daughter Ælfwenna, and her heirs, with ultimate reversion to Ramsey abbey; the remainder of the estate at Hatley to Leofsige; land at Potton, Bedfordshire, to the son of Leofsige's brother, after the death of Æffe, if he can get it from her by litigation; half the fishery at Welle (cf. Upwell and Outwell, Cambridgeshire and Norfolk) to his wife, and the other half to his son and two daughters.	Latin, Ramsey	
1504	819		A.D. 946 x 947			Will of Ealdorman Æthelwold, including bequests of 12 hides at Wylye, Wiltshire, to the bishop and episcopal community at Winchester; land at Ogbourne in Wiltshire, Æscesdune (cf. Ashdown) in Berkshire, Cheam in Surrey and Washington in Sussex, to his brother Eadric; at Broadwater in Sussex and South Newton in Wiltshire, to his brother Athelstan; at Carcel to his brother's son, Ælfsige; and at Cleran (Kingsclere, Hampshire) to the son of his brother Ælfstan.	English, Winchester, Old Minster	
1505			After A.D. 987			Will of Æthelwold, including bequests of 10 hides at Manningford Abbots, Wiltshire, to his wife for life, with reversion to New Minster, Winchester; and of land at Uptune (? Upton Scudamore, Wiltshire) to his son.	Old English, Middle English and Latin versions, Winchester, New Minster	
1506	1010		A.D. 941 x 958 (? 958)			(a) Agreement between Æthelweard and Archbishop Oda and the Christ Church community over land at Ickham, Kent. (b) Later agreement between Eadric and Christ Church respecting the estate.	English, Canterbury, Christ Church	
1507	553		A.D. 873 x 888			Will of King Alfred, including bequests of land at Lambourn and Wantage, Berkshire; at Stratton in Trigg and elsewhere in Cornwall; at Axmouth, Branscombe, Cullompton, Exminster, Hartland, Lifton, Tiverton, Whitchurch, Devon; at Sturminster Marshall, Dorset; at Candover, Crondall, Hurstbourne Priors, Hurstbourne Tarrant, Kingsclere, Meon, Hampshire; at Arreton in the Isle of Wight; in Kent; at Cannington, Carhampton, Chewton Mendip, Crewkerne, Kilton, Wedmore and Yeovil, Somerset; at Eashing, Godalming, Guildford, Leatherhead and Thunderfield Castle, Surrey; at Aldingbourne, Angmering, Beckley, Beeding, Beddingham, Dean, Ditchley, Felpham, Lyminster, Rotherfield, Sutton and Steyning, Sussex; at Amesbury, Ashton Keynes, Bedwyn, Chippenham, Chisledon, Edington and Pewsey, Wiltshire; also æt Suttune (Sutton, Hampshire or Wiltshire), æt Aweltune (Alton, Hampshire, or Alton Priors, Wiltshire), æt Deone (? East and West Dean, Sussex, or West Dean, Wiltshire), æt Sutheswyrth (? Lustleigh in Devon), æt Mylenburnam (? Silverton, Devon), æt Welewe and æt Welig (Wellow in Hampshire, Wiltshire or Somerset), æt Cumtune (Compton) and æt Burnham (Somerset); the beneficiaries including Winchester (Cathedral) and the king's children.	Old English, Middle English and Latin versions, Winchester, New Minster	
1508	558		A.D. 871 x 899			Will of Alfred, ealdorman, including bequests of 32 hides at Sanderstead and Selsdon in Surrey, 20 at Westerham in Kent, 6 at Lingfield and 10 at Horsley, both in Surrey, and 6 at Nettlestead, Kent [to his wife, Werburg, and their daughter, Alhthryth]; of a annual render of 200 pence from an estate at Clapham, Surrey [to Chertsey minster]; of 2 hides at Waddington and 1 at Gatton, Surrey [to his son, Æthelwald]; of 1 hide at Linkfield in Reigate, Surrey, to his kinsman Beorhtsige; of land at Nettlestead, Kent, to his kinsman Sigewulf, burdened with an annual render to Christ Church, Canterbury; of land at Farleigh, Kent, burdened with an annual render to Rochester, to Eadred, after Æthelred's time, with reversion to Alfred's maternal relatives.	English, Canterbury, Christ Church	
1509	649		A.D. 932 x 939			Alfred, thegn, bequeaths land at North Stoneham, Hampshire, to his wife for life, with reversion to New Minster, Winchester.	Old English, Middle English and Latin versions, Winchester, New Minster	
1510	417		A.D. 845 x 853			Will of Badanoth Beotting.	English, Canterbury, Christ Church	
1511	1132		A.D. 975 x 987 (? 980 x 987)			Will of Brihtric and Ælfswith, his wife, including bequests of 2 sulungs at Denton and 2 at Longfield, with renders from Hæslholt, Wateringbury, Birling and Harrietsham, all in Kent, to St Andrew's. Rochester; of land at Meopham, Kent, to Christ Church (Canterbury); and of land at Darenth to Brihtwaru for life with reversion to St Andrew's; of land at Birling to Wulfheah; at Wateringbury to Wulfsige; at Hæslholt to Sired; at Harrietsham to Wulfheah and Ælfheah; at Walkingstead (in Godstone, Surrey) to Wulfstan Ucca; at Stratton in Godstone, Surrey, to Walkingstead minster; and at Titsey, Surrey, to Wulfsige; also confirmation of earlier bequests of land at Fawkham, Bromley and Snodland, all in Kent, to St Andrew's (Rochester).	English and Latin versions, Rochester	
1512	390		A.D. 970 x 981 or 984		Old Minster (Winchester)	Bequest of land at Rimpton, Somerset.	English, Winchester, Old Minster	
1513	566		circa A.D. 900		the community at Winchester for their refectory	Bequest of 15 hides at Alton Priors, Wiltshire	Latin and English versions with English bounds, Winchester, Old Minster	
1514	486(2)		circa A.D. 855			Will of Dunn bequeathing a haga and land at Rochester to his wife for her life, with reversion to St Andrew's (Rochester).	English, Rochester	
1515	912		A.D. 951 x 955			Will of King Eadred, including bequests of land at Downton, Wiltshire, Damerham, Hampshire (formerly Wiltshire) and Calne, Wiltshire, to Old Minster, Winchester; at Wherwell, Andover and Kingsclere, Hampshire, to New Minster, Winchester; at Shalbourne, Wiltshire, Thatcham, Berkshire, and Bradford (? -on-Avon, Wiltshire), to Nunnaminster, Winchester; at Amesbury, Wiltshire, Wantage, Berkshire, and Basing, Hampshire, with land in Sussex, Surrey and Kent to his mother.	Old English, Middle English and Latin versions, Winchester, New Minster	
1516		921	s. xi med			Will of Eadwine concerning land at Algarsthorpe, Little Melton, Bergh Apton (Ashwell), Thorpe, Great Melton, Wreningham, all in Norfolk; the beneficiaries being (Bury) St Edmunds, St Benedict's (Holme), St Etheldreda's (Ely), and the churches at Algarsthorpe, Little Melton, Bergh Apton, Norfolk; and Holverstone, Suffolk; Blyford, Sparham, Ashwell, Fundenhall and Nayland in Wreningham, all in Norfolk, also Ketel.	English, Bury St Edmunds	
1517		920	circa A.D. 1050			Will of Eadwine of Caddington, including bequests of land at Watford, Hertfordshire, to St Albans; at Sundon, Streatley and Caddington, Bedfordshire, Hæslea (or Hærlea), Pirian, Putnoe, Bedfordshire, and Barley, Hertfordshire, to his son, Leofwine; and at Weston and Knebworth, Hertfordshire, to his wife. With reversion of Pirian to Abingdon Abbey and of Barley to St Albans. English, with Latin abstract.	English, with Latin abstract, St Albans	
1518		928	circa A.D. 1013			Will of Godric, including bequests of land at Terrington, Norfolk, to St Benedict's, Ramsey; and of land at Acleya to Eadnoth, his son, with reversion to Ramsey.	Latin, Ramsey	
1519		1339	A.D. 1052 x 1066			Will of Ketel, including bequests of land at Sisted, Essex, to Christ Church, Canterbury; at Harling, Norfolk, to Archbishop Stigand; the reversion of land at Great Melton, Norfolk, to St Benedict's at Holme and at Thorpe near Fundenhall, Norfolk, to Bury St Edmund's, after the deaths of Ketel and his uncle, Wulfric; land at Ketteringham, Norfolk, to his sister Bote, if she outlive him (if not, he is to have the land at Somerledetone [Somerton or Somerleyton, Suffolk]); land at Walsingham in East Carlton, Norfolk, to his sister Gode, if she outlive him (if not, he is to have the land at Preston, Suffolk); land at Hainford, Norfolk, and Coggeshall, Essex, to his brother Godric, and also land at Strattune (? Stratton Strawless, Norfolk), on payment of two pounds to Ælwig, Ketel's servant; the reversion of land at Onehouse, Suffolk, to Bury St Edmunds, after the deaths of Ketel and his stepdaughter, Ælfgifu; the half estate at Moran, Norfolk, to Earl Harold; land at Frating, Essex, according to an agreement made by (? Earl Harold) and Archbishop Stigand; land at Rashford, Suffolk, to Ælfric, his priest and kinsman.	English, Bury St Edmunds	
1520		932	A.D. 1017 x 1035			Will of Leofflæd, including bequests of land at Balsham, Cambridgeshire, to Ely Abbey; at Stetchworth to her daughters Ælfwyn and Æthelswith, for life, with reversion to Ely Abbey; at Wetheringsett, Suffolk, to her daughter, Leofwaru.	Latin, Ely	
1521		931	A.D. 1035 x 1044			Will of Leofgifu, including bequests of land at Hintlesham, Essex, and Gestingthorpe, Suffolk, to Bury St Edmunds; the minster at (? Earls) Colne, Essex, to Æthelric and Ælfric, priests, and Æthelsige, deacon; land at Belchamp (? Walter), Essex, to her lady; land at (? Great) Bentley, Essex, to Alfweard, bishop (of London); at Boreham, Essex, to her kinsman Ælfgar; at Bramford, Suffolk, to her kinsman Ælfric, Wihtgar's son; at Willesham, Suffolk, to Stigand; at Stonham, Waldingfield, Suffolk, and Little St Osyth, Essex, to Æthelric, her brother's son; at Haughley, Suffolk, to her daughter Ælfflæd; 3 hides at Warley, Essex, to Godwine, her brother-in-law; land at Stonham, Suffolk, to Æthelmær, (her reeve); 30 acres at Waldingfield, Suffolk, to Godric, her reeve at Waldingfield; land at Lawford, Essex, to Æthelric, her chaplain, and Ælfric and other servants; 1 hide at Forendale to Æthelric the priest.	English, Bury St Edmunds	
1522		1293	A.D. 998 (15 April)			Will of Leofwine, son of Wulfstan, including bequests of land at Kelvedon, Essex, and at Mearcyncg seollan (probably Markshall, Essex) to St Peter's, Westminster; at Purleigh, Essex, partly to God's servants at Notley, Essex, and partly to Leofwaru, his aunt; and at Barling, Essex, to Wulfstan, bishop (of London).	English, Westminster	
1523		1329	A.D. 1017 x 1035			Will of Mantat the anchorite bequeathing land at Twywell, Northamptonshire, and Conington, Huntingdonshire, to Thorney.	English, Thorney	
1524		943	s. x		Old Minster, Winchester	Bequest of 10 hides at Candover, Hampshire	English, Winchester, Old Minster	
1525	1014		s. x2-sxi			Will of Sifflæd, concerning the bequest of Marlingford, Norfolk, to (Bury) St Edmund's.	English, Bury St Edmunds	
1525a			s. x2-sxi			Will of Siflæd, including bequest of Marlingford, Norfolk, to Bury St Edmunds; and other bequests to Marlingford tunkirke and Christchurch in Norwich.	English, Bury St Edmunds	
1526	1008		A.D. 942 x circa 951			Will of Theodred, bishop of London, including bequests of land at Duxford in Cambridgeshire, Illyntone (probably Illington, Norfolk) and Arrington, Cambridgeshire, to the king; land at St Osyth in Essex, Southery in Norfolk, and Tillingham and Dunmow in Essex, to St Paul's, London; land at Mendham, Suffolk, to his sister's son, Osgot (except for the minster and 1 hide, to belong to the church); land at Shotford and Mettingham, Suffolk, to Mendham church; land at Syleham, Instead, Chickering, Ashfield Green, all in Suffolk, and Wrtinham (? Wortham, Suffolk) to Osgot; land at Horham, Athelington, Suffolk, to St Æthelberht's church at Hoxne; land at Lothingland, Suffolk, to Offa, his sister's son; land at Barton, Rougham, Pakenham, Suffolk, to his kinsman Osgot, Eadulf's son; land at Nowton, Horningsheath, Ickworth and Whepstead, Suffolk, to St Edmund's church (Bury); land at Waldringfield and a messuage in Ipswich, Suffolk, to Osgot, his sister's son; land at Wortham, Suffolk, to Wulfstan; with arrangements for the episcopal demesne in London and at Hoxne, Suffolk; at Wimbledon and Sheen, Surrey; at Fulham, Middlesex; and at Dengie, Essex.	English, Bury St Edmunds	
1527	1020		s. xi, probably before AD 1038			Will of Thurketel, including bequests of land at Palgrave, Suffolk, to Bury St Edmunds; half of Palgrave, Suffolk, to Bury St Edmunds, and half to the bishop; land at Roydon, Norfolk, Scortland, and the priest's toft, to the church; land at Shrimpling and half the land at Roydon, Norfolk, to his wife, Leofwyn; land at Wingfield, Suffolk, to his brother's sons Ulfketel and Thurketel; 15 acres at Palgrave, Suffolk, and a toft to Leofcwen; land at Thrandeston, Suffolk, to Osbeorn; 20 acres at Roydon, Norfolk, to his nephew Leofric, his kinsman Godwine, and Wulfwine and his brother.	English, Bury St Edmunds	
1528	1017		s. xi, probably after 1020			Will of Thurketel Heyng, including bequests of land at Caister, Norfolk, and Thorpe (? Thorpe Abbots or Morningthorpe, Norfolk) to St Benedict's at Holme and Bury St Edmunds; land at Ormesby, Norfolk, to his daughter Ælfwyn, with reversion to Holme; land at Scratby, Norfolk to his nephews' children, the sons of Swegen and Ealhmund.	English, Bury St Edmunds	
1529		980	s. xi med		(Bury) St Edmunds	Bequest of land at Wereham, Norfolk.	English, Bury St Edmunds	
1530		788	A.D. 1042 x 1043			Bequest by Thurstan of land at Wimbish, Essex, to Christ Church.	English and Latin versions, Canterbury, Christ Church	
1531			A.D. 1043 x 1045			Will of Thurstan, son of Wine, including bequests of land at Wimbish, Essex, to Christ Church, Canterbury; at Harlow, Essex (except the half hide at Ealing Bridge in Harlow which Ælfwine had), and Shouldham, Norfolk, to Bury St Edmunds; land at Wetheringsett, Suffolk, and at Knapwell, Cambridgeshire, to Ely abbey; land at Weston Colville, Cambridgeshire, to Æthelswith, for life, with reversion to Ely; land at Shouldham, Norfolk, to Ramsey and St Benedict's at Holme; land at Borough Green, Cambridgeshire, to Ulfketel, if he outlives Thurstan, except a half hide at Westley Waterless and 1 hide at Dullingham (granted to Thurstan's servant, Viking); land in Norfolk and at Pentlow, Ashdon and Henham, Essex, to his wife Æthelgyth (except land at Bromleg [possibly Bromley Barn in Widdington] and half a hide at Henham, to go to the local minsters); land at Kedington, Suffolk, to the priest Ælfwig and Thurstan's chaplains Thurstan and Ordheah; land at Little Dunmow, Essex, to Merewine and his family; and instructions that land at Bidicheseye (? Bottisham, Cambridgeshire) was to be sold and payments made to a number of beneficiaries. With an additional section detailing further bequests, including the reversion of land at Henham, Essex, to Æthelswith and then to Ely abbey; a half hide at Ongar, Essex, to Thurgot, his servant; a half hide and a haga near Marden Ash in High Ongar, Essex, to Merewine; and a half hide to Swegn.	English, Bury St Edmunds	
1532		954	circa A.D. 1050			Will of Ulf (Wulf), including bequest of land at Aston, Hertfordshire, and Oxwick (lost, in Codicote, Hertfordshire) to St Albans; other beneficiaries including Ramsey, St Peter's in Rome and Earl Sihtricirca.	Latin and English versions, St Albans	
1533	678		A.D. 931 x 939 (probably 933 x 939)			Will of Wulfgar, including bequests of land at Collingbourne Kingston, Wiltshire, to his wife Æffe, for life, with reversion to New Minster, Winchester; at Inkpen, Berkshire, to Æffe, for life, with reversion to the church at Kintbury, Berkshire; at Cræft to Wynsige and Ælfsige; at Denford, Berkshire, to Æthelstan and Cynestan; 2 hides at Buttermere, Wiltshire, to Brihtsige and one of Ceolstan's sons; at Æscmere (cf. Ashmanworth, Hampshire) 'to such of my young kinsmen as obey me best'; and at Ham, Wiltshire, to Æffe, for life, with reversion to Old Minster, Winchester.	English, Winchester, Old Minster	
1534	1317		Probably circa 1000.			Will of Wulfgeat of Donington, Shropshire, including bequests of land at Tardebigge, Worcestershire, as burial-fee (possibly to Donington church); also land at Kilsall, in Shropshire, Evenlode in Gloucestershire and at Roden, Shropshire, to his wife; land at Donington and Thornbury, Herefordshire, to his daughter, Wulfgifu; land at Ingardine, Shropshire, to his grandson; land at Tardebigge, Worcestershire, to his daughter, Wilflæd. His potential claim to Wrottesley, Staffordshire, is mentioned.	English, Worcester	
1535		782	A.D. 1042 x 1053, possibly 1046			Will of Wulfgyth, including bequests of land at Stisted, Essex, to her sons Ælfketel and Ketel, for life, with reversion to Christ Church (Canterbury); at Walsingham in East Carleton, East Carleton and Harling, Norfolk, to her sons Ulfketel and Ketel; at Saxlingham, Norfolk, and Somerton (or Somerleyton), Suffolk, to her daughters, Gode and Bote; at Chadacre, Suffolk, and Ashford (? Kent) to her daughter Ealdgyth; and at Fritton (Norfolk or Suffolk) to Earl Godwine and Earl Harold.	English, Canterbury, Christ Church	
1536		1298	A.D. 1002 x 1004			Will of Wulfric, including bequests of land at Dumbleton, Gloucestershire; in south Lancashire; in Wirral; at Rolleston, Harlaston, Staffordshire; Beorelfestune (? Barlaston, Staffordshire or Barlestone, Leicestershire); Marchington, Staffordshire; Conisborough, Yorkshire WR; Alvaston, Derbyshire; Northtune (? Norton juxta Twycross, Leicestershire); Elford, Oakley, Tamworth, Balterley, Staffordshire; Walesho (? Wales, Yorkshire WR); Thorpe Savin, Yorkshire WR; Whitwell, Clowne, Barlborough, Duckmanton, Mosborough, Eckington, Beighton, Derbyshire; Doncaster, Yorkshire WR; Morlingtune; Austrey, Warwickshire; Palterton, Derbyshire; Wibtoft, Warwickshire; Twongan (? Tonge, Leicestershire, or Tong, Shropshire); Burton upon Trent, Stretton, Bromley, Pillaton, Gailey, Whiston, Staffordshire; Laganford (? Longford, Shropshire); Stirchley, Staffordshire; Niwantun æt thære wic (probably Newton by Middlewich, Cheshire); Wædedun, Niwantun (? Newton Solney, Derbyshire); Winshill, Staffordshire; Suttun; Ticknall, Derbyshire; Shenton, Wigston Parva, Lecis.; Halen (? Hawne in Halesowen, Worcestershire); Hremesleage (? Romsley, Shropshire); Shiplea, Shropshire; Suthtune (? Sutton Maddock, Shropshire); Actune (? Acton Trussel in Baswich, Staffordshire); Darlaston, Rudyard, Cotwalton, Church Leigh, Staffordshire; Okeover, Ilam, Cauldon, Derbyshire; Castern, Staffordshire; Suthtune (? Sutton on the Hill, Derbyshire); Morley, Breadsall, Morton, Pilsley, Ogston, North Wingfield, Snodeswic, Derbyshire; Tathwell, Lincolnshire; Appleby Magna, Leicestershire; Weston in Arden, Burton Hastings, Warwickshire; Sharnford, Leicestershire; Harbury, Warwickshire; Aldsworth, Arlington, Gloucestershire; Eccleshale (? Eccleshall, Staffordshire); Waddune; Sheen, Staffordshire; Langandune (? Longdon, Staffordshire); Bupton, Stretton, Derbyshire; the beneficiaries including Archbishop Ælfric, Morcar, Burton Abbey and the community at Tamworth.	English, Burton	
1537	1162	979	A.D. 1022 x 1034			Will of Wulfsige, including bequest of land at Wiken to Bury St Edmunds, Bishop Ælfric and, for her life, to Wulfwyn.	English, Bury St Edmunds	
1538		694	A.D. 984 x 1016 (probably 984 x 1001)			Will of Wulfwaru, including bequests of land at Freshford, Somerset, to Ælfhere, abbot of Bath; at Claverton, Compton and Butcombe, Somerset, to Wulfmær, her son; at Butcombe to Ælfwaru, her daughter; at Leigh, Holton, Somerset, and at Hocgestune, to Ælfwine, her son; at Winford, Somerset, to Gode, her daughter.	English, Bath	
1539		1290	s. x or xi			Will of Wynflæd concerning land at Ebbesborne, Wiltshire; Charlton (probably Horethorne, Somerset); Coleshill, Berkshire; Inggeneshamme (perhaps Inglesham, Wiltshire); Faccombe, Hants; Adderbury, Oxfordshire; and at Chinnock, Somerset; the beneficiaries including Shaftesbury and Wilton.	English, uncertain (? Shaftesbury)	
1561			No date.			Boundary between the dioceses of Hereford and Worcester, at the time of Bishop Athelstan (of Hereford, 1013 x 1016 -1056).	English, Hereford, St Æthelberht's	
1603	844		A.D. 685 x 689	Cædwalla, king of Wessex	Abingdon Abbey	Part of a grant of land at Cumnor, Berkshire, at Geatescun and woodland called Ædeleahing.	Latin, Abingdon	Cædwalla (of Wessex)
1604	676		No Date.		?	Grant of land) at Bultheswrthe.	Latin with English bounds, Abingdon	
1605			A.D. 892 x 900			Attestation clause of a charter of King Alfred, now lost.	Athelney	
1606	773		A.D. 942		Wulfsige Maur	Note of a grant in the same terms as no. 484 of land at Croxall, Cotton, Walton-on-Trent, Drakelow, Stapenhill, Derbyshire, and at Sulueston.	Latin, Burton	
1608			A.D. 1044 x 1052		St Edmunds Abbey	Bequest of land at Dickleburgh and Semer, Norfolk.	English and Latin versions, Bury St Edmunds	
1610	69		A.D. 687	Cædwalla, king	Archbishop Theodore and Christ Church, Canterbury	Grant of land at Giddinge and Wootton, Kent.	Latin, Canterbury, Christ Church	
1611	161		A.D. 741	Eadberht, king	Christ Church, Canterbury	Grant of fishing rights in the river Lympne, of land around the oratorium of St Martin, and of pasture at Bisceopesuuic.	Latin, Canterbury, Christ Church	
1612	173		A.D. 747	Eadberht, king of Kent	Deneheah, abbot, and Reculver church	Grant of the toll due on one ship at Fordwich, Kent.	Latin, Canterbury, Christ Church	
1613	301		A.D. 791	Cenwulf, king	Christ Church, Canterbury	Grant of land at Tenham, Kent, in exchange for land at the source of the Cray, Kent.	Latin, Canterbury, Christ Church	
1614	263		A.D. 791	Offa, king	Christ Church, Canterbury	Grant of land at Ickham, Palmstead and Ruckinge, Kent, with woodland etc elsewhere, as in no.	123 Latin, Canterbury, Christ Church	
1619	367		A.D. 821	Cenwulf, king	Wulfred, archbishop	Short version of grant of land at Coppanston, Gretaniarse and Scealdefordan.	Latin, Canterbury, Christ Church	
1620	372		A.D. 822	Beornwulf, king	Wulfred, archbishop	Note of grant of land at Godmersham.	Latin, Canterbury, Christ Church	
1621	382		A.D. 824	Wulfred, archbishop	Christ Church, Canterbury	Note of grant of land at Eastur, Waldingtun, near Canterbury.	Latin, Canterbury, Christ Church	
1622			A.D. 805 x 832			Extract from a charter of Wulfred, archbishop of Canterbury, concerning the alienability of bookland.	Canterbury, Christ Church	
1623	408		A.D. 832 for 833 x 858	Æthelwulf, king	Christ Church, Canterbury	Short version of grant of land at Ebony in the Isle of Oxney, Deiferthesea, Mistanham, Langeburnan, Blaceburnanham, Pleguuiningham, Ofneham; pasture in Ægylbyrhtingahyrst; the wood called Hostringedenne; Barton near Canterbury with meadows at Scitinge and Thanington, Kent.	Latin, Canterbury, Christ Church	
1624	414		A.D. 835	Cynewaru, abbess	Hunberht, dux	Short version of grant of land at Wirksworth, Derbyshire, on condition of annual render of lead to Ceolnoth, archbishop, his successors and to Christ Church, Canterbury.	Latin, Canterbury, Christ Church	
1625	427		A.D. 839			Note of purchase by Ceolnoth, archbishop of Canterbury, from Hæleth, princeps, of land at Chart.	Latin, Canterbury, Christ Church	
1626	446		A.D. 844	Æthelwulf, king	Christ Church, Canterbury	Note of confirmation of the grant by Oswulf, dux, of land at Estre Stanhamstede (East Stanstead, Kent).	Latin, Canterbury, Christ Church	
1627	572		A.D. 895	Plegmund, archbishop	Christ Church	Note of grant of land at Wefingemersc near the river Romney, Kent.	Latin, Canterbury, Christ Church	
1628	577		A.D. 898 or 899		Plegmund, archbishop, and to Christ Church, and to Wærferth, bishop, and the church of Worcester	Grant of 2 yokes of land at Ætheredes hyd (Queenhithe) on the Thames, one to each.	Latin with bounds, Canterbury, Christ Church	
1629	637		A.D. 923			Notes of purchase by Wulfhelm, archbishop, of land near Ealdanstrate, and of land at Wadland and Wlfrethingland (outside Canterbury).	Latin with bounds, Canterbury, Christ Church	
1630	698		A.D. 933 or 934, ? for 944		Christ Church, Canterbury	Note of grant of land at Hamme, Sussex.	Latin, Canterbury, Christ Church	
1631	823		A.D. 947		Christ Church, Canterbury	Note of grant of land at Patching, Sussex.	Latin, Canterbury, Christ Church	
1632	1038		A.D. 958		the monasteries of Kent	Confirmation of privileges.	Latin, Canterbury, Christ Church	
1633	1049		A.D. 959	Æthelweard, minister of King Edgar	Christ Church, Canterbury	Note of grant of land at Mulaton.	Latin, Canterbury, Christ Church	
1634	1102		A.D. 963	Dunstan, archbishop	Christ Church (Canterbury)	Note of grant of land at Vange, Essex, purchased by him from Ingelram.	Latin, Canterbury, Christ Church	
1635	1126		A.D. 964		the church of St Mary, Lyminge	Note of grant of land at Ulaham.	Latin, Canterbury, Christ Church	
1636			A.D. 979		Christ Church, Canterbury	Note of grant of land at Sandwich and Eastry, Kent.	Latin and English versions, Canterbury, Christ Church	
1637			A.D. 991	Brihtnoth, dux	Christ Church, Canterbury	Grant of land at Lawling, Essex; Eleigh and Hadleigh, Suffolk.	Latin, Canterbury, Christ Church	
1638		697	A.D. 997 for 1002 x 1051		Christ Church (Canterbury)	Grant of land at Newington and Britwell Prior, Oxfordshire	Latin, Canterbury, Christ Church	
1639			circa A.D. 1001	Ælfflæd, wife of Brihtnoth	Christ Church, Canterbury	Grant of land at Hadleigh, Suffolk.	Latin, Canterbury, Christ Church	
1640			A.D. 1010		Christ Church, Canterbury	Grant of land at Warehorne, Kent, with note of the grant to Christ Church in his days of land at Farningham and Wootton, Kent.	Latin, Canterbury, Christ Church	
1641			A.D. 1018		Christ Church, Canterbury	Grant of land at Merstham and Cheieham, Surrey.	Latin, Canterbury, Christ Church	
1642			A.D. 1035		Eadsige, bishop of St Martin's, near Canterbury	Grant for Christ Church of land at Appeldore, Palstre and at Wittersham, Kent.	Latin, Canterbury, Christ Church	
1643			A.D. 1038		Christ Church, Canterbury	Grant of land at Folkestone, Kent.	Latin, Canterbury, Christ Church	
1644			A.D. 1040 x 1042	Wulfstan, wilde preost	Christ Church, Canterbury	Grant of land at Thurrock, Essex.	Latin, Canterbury, Christ Church	
1645			A.D. 1042 x 1066		Christ Church, Canterbury	Grant of land at St Osyth, Essex.	Latin, Canterbury, Christ Church	
1646			A.D. 1042 x 1066		Christ Church, Canterbury	Grant of land at Stisted and Coggeshal, Essex.	Latin, Canterbury, Christ Church	
1647			A.D. 1042 x 1066	Nithard, formerly King Edmund's ioculator	Christ Church, Canterbury	Grant of land at Walworth, Surrey.	Latin, Canterbury, Christ Church	
1648	44		A.D. 678	Hlothhere, king of Kent	Æbba, abbess	Grant of land at Sudaneie in the Isle of Thanet, and at Sturry, Kent.	Latin, Canterbury, St Augustine's	
1649			A.D. 838	Æthelwulf, king of Wessex and Kent	Wernod, abbot of St Augustine's	Grant of 5 ploughlands at East Lenham, Kent.	Canterbury, St Augustine's	
1650			A.D. 848		St Augustine's, Canterbury	Grant of land at Burmarsh, Kent.	Canterbury, St Augustine's	
1651			A.D. 844 x 864		St Augustine's	Grant of land at Burmarsh and at Wyk (Snavewick), Kent.	Canterbury, St Augustine's	
1652			? A.D. 871 x 899	Æthelfrith	St Augustine's Abbey	Grant of land called Ateleswold (Aylesford) in Willesborough and at Hinxhill, Kent.	Canterbury, St Augustine's	
1653			A.D. 974		St Augustine's	Grant of 100 acres at Little Mongeham, to the north of curie de Northborn, i.e. Northbourne, Kent.	Canterbury, St Augustine's	
1654			A.D. 991	Bruman, portreve	Sigeric, abbot of St Augustine's	Grant, for life, of 2 hagas and a meadow at Fordwich, Kent, with reversion to the abbey.	Canterbury, St Augustine's	
1655			A.D. 997		St Augustine's	Bequest of land at Combe.	Canterbury, St Augustine's	
1656			A.D. 1009		St Augustine's	Bequest of 100 acres at Sturton in Romney Marsh.	English, Canterbury, St Augustine's	
1657			A.D. 1045			Royal charter concerning Selling and Combrook or Kennington, Kent.	Canterbury, St Augustine's	
1658			A.D. 1059 x 1070	Æthelsige, abbot of St Augustine's	Blæcmann and Æthelred, sons of Brihtmær	Grant in gavelkind of land at Dene (? in Thanet).	English, Canterbury, St Augustine's	
1659	1256		s. x/xi	Northman, eorl	St Cuthbert’s	Note of grant of land at Escomb, co. Durham.	English, Durham	
1660	1255		s. x	Thored, eorl	St Cuthbert’s	Note of grant of land at Smeaton, Crayke and Sutton-on-Forest, Yorkshire	English, Durham	
1661	390		s. x/xi	Ulfketel, son of Osulf	St Cuthbert’s	Note of grant of land at Norton, co. Durham.	English, Durham	
1662	1024		A.D. 951 x 955 or 956 (ii)		?	Land at Bathingbourne in Godshill, Isle of Wight.	Witnesses and English bounds, Evesham	
1663	1025		A.D. 955 x 959		Æthelgeard, his faithful minister	Grant of land at Bathingbourne in Godshill, Isle of Wight.	Latin with English bounds, Evesham	
1664		1299	A.D. 1003		?	Grant of land at Bengeworth,Worcestershire	Latin with English bounds, Evesham	
1665			? A.D. 676 x 685	Baldred, king	Hæmgils, abbot	Grant of a fishery in the river Parret.	Glastonbury	
1666			A.D. 678	Centwine, king of Wessex	Hæmgils	The abbacy of Glastonbury and 6 hides at Glastonbury.	Glastonbury	
1667			A.D. 676 x 685	Centwine, king of Wessex	Wilfrid, bishop	Grant of land at Wedmore, Somerset.	Glastonbury	
1668			A.D. 676 x 685	Centwine, king of Wessex	—	Grant of land at Clewer in Wedmore, Somerset.	Glastonbury	
1670			A.D. 705 x 712		Beorhtwald, abbot of Glastonbury	Grant of land at the foot of Mendip.	Glastonbury	
1671			A.D. 688 x 726		Glastonbury Abbey	Grant of 20 hides at Brentemarais (South Brent, Somerset).	Glastonbury	
1672			A.D. 688 x 726		Glastonbury Abbey	Grant of 20 hides at Pilton, Somerset.	Glastonbury	
1673			A.D. 688 x 726	Ine, king of Wessex	Glastonbury Abbey	Grant of land at Oram.	Glastonbury	
1674			A.D. 705 x 709	Wilfrid, bishop	Beorhtwald, abbot of Glastonbury	Grant of land at Wedmore, Somerset.	Glastonbury	
1675			A.D. 705 x 712	Wilfrid, bishop	Glastonbury Abbey	Grant of 1 hide at Clewer, Somerset.	Glastonbury	
1676			A.D. 729	Æthelheard, king of Wessex	Glastonbury Abbey	Grant of 10 hides in the valley of the river Torridge, Devon.	Glastonbury	
1677			A.D. 729 x 740	Frithugyth, wife of king Æthelheard	Glastonbury Abbey	Grant of 5 hides at Brompton, Somerset.	Glastonbury	
1678			A.D. 745	Cuthred, king of Wessex	Tunbeorht, abbot	Grant of 3 hides at Ure.	Glastonbury	
1679			A.D. 746		Tunbeorht, abbot of Glastonbury	Grant of 4 hides at Jecesig and Bradanleghe.	Glastonbury	
1680			A.D. 754	Sigebeorht, king	Tica, abbot, and Glastonbury Abbey	Grant of 22 hides in Poholt, Somerset.	Glastonbury	
1681			A.D. 760 x 762	Cynewulf, king	Æthelheard, his minister	Grant of 3 hides at Cedern or Elenbearo (Elborough in Hutton, Somerset).	Glastonbury	
1682			A.D. 757 x 786	Cynewulf (king of Wessex)	Bica	Grant of land at Mildenhall, Wiltshire	Glastonbury	
1683			A.D. 756 x 760	Cynewulf (king of Wessex)	Cuthbert	Grant of land at Culm Davy, Devon.	Glastonbury	
1684			A.D. 760	Cynewulf, king of Wessex	Guba, abbot of Glastonbury	Grant of 5 hides at Wootton, Somerset.	Glastonbury	
1685			A.D. 762	Cynewulf, king of Wessex	Wealdhun, abbot of Glastonbury	Grant of 5 hides at Cumtun.	Glastonbury	
1686			A.D. 757 x 786	Cynewulf, king	—	Grant of land at Aldamtone and elsewhere.	Glastonbury	
1687			A.D. 756 x 760	Cynewulf (king of Wessex)	Cuthbert	Grant of land at Culmstock, Devon.	Glastonbury	
1688			A.D. 757 x 786	Cynewulf, king of Wessex	—	Grant of land at Cynemersforda.	Glastonbury	
1689			A.D. 757 x 786	Cynewulf (king of Wessex)	—	Concerning land at Horuton.	Glastonbury	
1690			A.D. 757 x 786	Cynewulf, king of Wessex	—	Grant of land at Mertone.	Glastonbury	
1691			circa A.D. 760		Sulca	Grant of land at Culmstock, Devon.	Glastonbury	
1692			A.D. 794	Offa, king of Mercia	Beaduwulf, abbot, for the church of Glastonbury	Grant of 10 hides at Eswirht, or Inesuuyrth juxta Hunstpill, Somerset.	Glastonbury	
1693			A.D. 802	Egbert, king of Wessex	Glastonbury Abbey	Grant of land and privileges for land by the river Torridge, Devon.	Glastonbury	
1694			A.D. 839 x 858		Æthelwulf	Grant of 10 hides at Clutton, Somerset.	Glastonbury	
1695			A.D. 839 x 855		Glastonbury Abbey	Grant of 10 hides at Braunton, Devon, ad capturam isiciorum.	Glastonbury	
1696			A.D. 839 x 855		Glastonbury Abbey	Grant of land at Monk Okehampton, Devon.	Glastonbury	
1697			A.D. 839 x 855		Glastonbury Abbey	Grant of 24 hides at Uffculme, Devon.	Glastonbury	
1698			A.D. 839 x 855	Æthelwulf, king of Wessex	—	Grant of land at Lennucmere.	Glastonbury	
1699			A.D. 855 x 860	Æthelbald, king	Eanulf	Grant of land at Hornblawerton (Hornblotton, Somerset) juxta Dichesgete (Ditcheat).	Glastonbury	
1700			A.D. 855 x 860	Æthelbald, king	Heregyth	Grant of land at Wodetone.	Glastonbury	
1701			A.D. 852 x 874	Burgred (? king of Mercia)	Eanulf	Grant of land at Binegar, Somerset.	Glastonbury	
1702			A.D. 852 x 874	Burgred, king of Mercia	Æthelred	Grant of land at Lydney, Gloucestershire	Glastonbury	
1703			A.D. 871 x 879	Tunbeorht, bishop (of Winchester)	Glastonbury Abbey	Grant of land at Logderesdone (Montacute, Somerset).	Glastonbury	
1704			A.D. 871 x 899	Alfred (king of Wessex)	Wulfhere	Grant of land at Hannington, Wiltshire	Glastonbury	
1705			A.D. 922		Ealdhun, abbot	Restitution of land at Cumtone (Compton, Somerset).	Glastonbury	
1706			A.D. 899 x 925		—	Grant of land at Pilsdon, Devon.	Glastonbury	
1707			A.D. 899 x 925		—	Grant of land at Portbury, Somerset.	Glastonbury	
1708			A.D. 899 x 925		—	Grant of land at Yeovilton, Somerset.	Glastonbury	
1709			A.D. 924 x 939		Ælfric	Grant of land at Byrhtulfingtun becocer (? Burton near North Coker, Somerset).	Glastonbury	
1710			A.D. 924 x 939		Affe	Grant of land at Worston, Somerset.	Glastonbury	
1711			A.D. 924 x 939		Athelstan	Grant of land at Weston vel Foxcot.	Glastonbury	
1712			A.D. 924 x 939		Æthelred	Grant of land at Henstridge, Somerset.	Glastonbury	
1713			A.D. 924 x 939		Osfrith	Grant of land atOver (alias Monton) Deverill, Wiltshire	Glastonbury	
1714			A.D. 924 x 939		Wulfhelm, archbishop	Grant of land at Deverill, Wiltshire	Glastonbury	
1715			A.D. 924 x 939		Wulfhelm	Grant of land at Hamanstane.	Glastonbury	
1716			A.D. 924 x 939		—	Concerning Idmiston, Wiltshire	Glastonbury	
1717			No Date.		Ælfric	Grant of land at Stoke.	Glastonbury	
1718			A.D. 939 x 946		Ælgar	Grant of land at Camel, Somerset.	Glastonbury	
1719			A.D. 939 x 946		Ælfflæd	Grant of land at Okeford Fitzpaine, Dorset.	Glastonbury	
1720			A.D. 939 x 946		Ælfswith	Grant of land at Upavon, Wiltshire	Glastonbury	
1721			A.D. 939 x 946		Æthelwold	Grant of land at Chelworth, Wiltshire	Glastonbury	
1722			A.D. 939 x 946		Alfred	Grant of land at Rowberrow, Somerset.	Glastonbury	
1723			A.D. 939 x 946		Glastonbury Abbey	Grant of half a hide at Escford, with a fishery.	Glastonbury	
1724			A.D. 939 x 946		Glastonbury Abbey	Grant of 30 hides at Pucklechurch, Gloucestershire	Glastonbury	
1725			A.D. 939 x 946		Glastonbury Abbey	Grant of 8 hides at Stane (probably Stone in East Pennard, Somerset).	Glastonbury	
1726			A.D. 939 x 946		Glastonbury Abbey	Grant of 4 hides at Whatley, Somerset.	Glastonbury	
1727			A.D. 939 x 946		Sigewulf	Grant of land at Abbotsbury, Dorset.	Glastonbury	
1728			A.D. 939 x 946		Wilfric	Grant of 5 hides at Tintinhull, Somerset.	Glastonbury	
1729			A.D. 939 x 946		Wilfric (or Wilfrid)	Grant of land at Turnworth, Dorset.	Glastonbury	
1730			A.D. 939 x 946		Wulflaf	Grant of land at Piddle, Dorset.	Glastonbury	
1731			A.D. 939 x 946		Wulfric (or Wilfrid), his minister	Grant of 10 hides at Yarlington, Somerset.	Glastonbury	
1732			A.D. 939 x 946		—	Grant of land at Clutton, Somerset.	Glastonbury	
1733			A.D. 939 x 946		—	Grant of land at Cympanhamme.	Glastonbury	
1734			A.D. 939 x 946		—	Grant of land at Eatumberesd’.	Glastonbury	
1735			A.D. 939 x 946		—	Grant of land at Lutramton’.	Glastonbury	
1736			A.D. 946 x 955		Ælheah	Grant of land at Henstridge, Somerset.	Glastonbury	
1737			A.D. 946 x 955		Ælfhere	Grant of land at Bocland.	Glastonbury	
1738			A.D. 946 x 955		Æthelwold	Grant of land at Camerton, Somerset.	Glastonbury	
1739			A.D. 946 x 955		Alfred	Grant of 5 hides at Camerton, Somerset.	Glastonbury	
1740			A.D. 946 x 955		Alfred	Grant of land at Tarnock in Badgeworth, Somerset, and at Stapelwill’ (?Stawell, Somerset).	Glastonbury	
1741			A.D. 954		Dunstan	Grant of 2 hides at Twinam, i.e. Christchuch, Hampshire	Glastonbury	
1742			A.D. 946 x 955		Glastonbury Abbey	Grant of 2 hides at Nunney and restoration of land at Doulting, Somerset.	Glastonbury	
1743			A.D. 946 x 955		Wilfric, his minister	Grant of 10 hides at Hortone.	Glastonbury	
1744			A.D. 946 x 955		Wulfhelm, bishop (of Wells)	Grant of land at Pucklechurch, Gloucestershire	Glastonbury	
1745			A.D. 946 x 955		Wulfric	Grant of land at Cumbe.	Glastonbury	
1746			A.D. 955 x 959		Ælheah	Grant of land at Cranmore, Somerset.	Glastonbury	
1747			A.D. 955 x 957		Ælfhere	Grant of land at Westbury-on-Severn, Gloucestershire	Glastonbury	
1748			A.D. 955 x 959		Ælfswith	Grant of land at Pendesclive.	Glastonbury	
1749			A.D. 955 x 959		Ælfwine	Grant of land at Stourton, Wiltshire	Glastonbury	
1750			A.D. 955 x 959		Ælfwold	Grant of land at Peasucmere.	Glastonbury	
1751			A.D. 955 x 959		Æthelric	Grant of land at Wydancumbe.	Glastonbury	
1752			A.D. 955 x 959		Æthelwold	Grant of land at Sharpham, Somerset.	Glastonbury	
1753			A.D. 955 x 959		Brihthere	Grant of land at Woodyates, Dorset.	Glastonbury	
1754			A.D. 955 x 959		Brihtric	Grant of land at Yeovilton, Somerset.	Glastonbury	
1755			A.D. 955 x 959		Cynric	Grant of land at Camel, Somerset.	Glastonbury	
1756			A.D. 955 x 959		Cynric	Grant of land at Lamyatt, Somerset.	Glastonbury	
1757			A.D. 955 x 959		Glastonbury Abbey	Grant of land at Blackford, Somerset.	Glastonbury	
1758			A.D. 955 x 959		Wulfod’	Grant of land at Easeteneton’.	Glastonbury	
1759			A.D. 959 x 975		Ælfhere	Grant of land at Orchardleigh, Somerset.	Glastonbury	
1760			A.D. 959 x 975		Ælfhere, dux	Grant of 40 hides at Westbury-on-Severn, Gloucestershire	Glastonbury	
1761			A.D. 959 x 975		Ælfswith	Grant of land at Ætheresig (Nyland) and at Stratton, Somerset.	Glastonbury	
1762			A.D. 959 x 975		Ælfswith	Grant of land at Winscombe, Somerset.	Glastonbury	
1763			A.D. 959 x 975		Ælfwold	Grant of land at Hannington, Wiltshire	Glastonbury	
1764			A.D. 959 x 975		Brihtric	Grant of land at Camel, Somerset.	Glastonbury	
1765			A.D. 959 x 975		Byrnsige	Grant of land at Holton, Somerset.	Glastonbury	
1766			A.D. 959 x 975		Ealdred	Grant of land at Cleeve, Somerset.	Glastonbury	
1767			A.D. 959 x 975		Ealdred	Grant of land at Durborough in Stogursey, Somerset.	Glastonbury	
1768			A.D. 959 x 975		Glastonbury Abbey	Grant of land at Blackford, Somerset.	Glastonbury	
1769			A.D. 959 x 975		Glastonbury Abbey	Grant of 2 hides at Luccombe, Somerset.	Glastonbury	
1770			A.D. 959 x 975		Glastonbury Abbey	Grant of 3 hides at Wheathill, Somerset.	Glastonbury	
1771			A.D. 959 x 975		—	Grant of land at Ubley, Somerset.	Glastonbury	
1772			A.D. 959 x 975		—	Grant of land at Widamgate.	Glastonbury	
1773			A.D. 959 x 975		Sigegar, abbot of Glastonbury	Grant of 17 hides at Hamme (? High Ham, Somerset).	Glastonbury	
1774			A.D. 984		Glastonbury Abbey	Grant of a mansa in Wilton.	Glastonbury	
1775			A.D. 1000		Beorhtred, abbot of Glastonbury	Grant of a fishery.	Glastonbury	
1776			A.D. 979 x 1016		Glastonbury Abbey	Grant of land in Hannington, Wiltshire	Glastonbury	
1777			A.D. 979 x 1016		Glastonbury Abbey	Restitution of 30 hides at Pucklechurch, Gloucestershire	Glastonbury	
1778			A.D. 979 x 1016		Glastonbury Abbey	Grant of 1 hide at Sethebeorge.	Glastonbury	
1779			A.D. 979 x 1016		Godric	Grant of land at Stoke.	Glastonbury	
1780			A.D. 979 x 997		Sigegar, abbot of Glastonbury	Grant of 6 hides at Aust Cliff, Gloucestershire	Glastonbury	
1781			A.D. 979 x 1016		—	Grant of land at Portbury, Somerset.	Glastonbury	
1783			A.D. 693 x 704	Æthelred, king of Mercia	Waldhere, bishop (of London)	Grant of land at Ealing, Middlesex	Latin, London, St Paul's	
1784			circa A.D. 704 x 709	Offa, king of Essex	Waldhere, bishop of London	Grant of land at Hemel Hempstead, Hertfordshire	Latin, London, St Paul's	
1785			A.D. 704 x 709	Tyrhtil, bishop (of Hereford)	Waldhere, bishop of London	Grant of land at Fulham, Middlesex	Latin, London, St Paul's	
1786			A.D. 704 x 709			Cenred, king of Mercia, renews the sanctio of Æthelberht, king (of Kent), in favour of St Paul’s, London.	Latin, London, St Paul's	
1787			circa A.D. 706 x circa 709	Swæfred, king of Essex	Ingwald, bishop of London	Grant of land at Dengie, Essex.	Latin, London, St Paul's	
1788			A.D. 716 x 745	Æthelbald, king of Mercia	Ingwald, bishop of London	Grant of the toll and custom due from one ship. now 103b.	Latin, London, St Paul's	
1789			circa A.D. 706 x 745			Signature to a charter in favour of Ingwald, bishop (of London).	London, St Paul's	
1790			A.D. 757 x 796			Offa, king of Mercia, extends the liberties of St Paul’s.	Latin	
1791			After A.D. 825	Ceolberht, bishop of London, and the community of St Paul	Sigeric, minister of Wiglaf, king of Mercia	Lease of land at Braughing, Hertfordshire	Latin with English, London, St Paul's	
1792			A.D. 935			Extract, with witness, from a charter of King Athelstan.	Latin	
1793			A.D. 946		Eawynn, a nun	Grant of land at Shopland, Essex.	Latin, London, St Paul's	
1794			A.D. 957		Brihthelm, bishop (of London)	Grant of land at Orsett, Essex.	Latin, London, St Paul's	
1795			A.D. 946 x 975			King Edgar allows Æthelflæd, widow of his father Edmund, to give land at Hadham, Hertfordshire, to St Paul’s.	Latin	
1796			A.D. 986			Dating clause and three witnesses from a charter of King Æthelred.	Latin, London, St Paul's	
1797	584		A.D. 901		Ordlaf, comes	Note of the lease for five lives of land at Mannington in Lydiard Tregoze, Wiltshire, in exchange for land at Chelworth near Crudwell, Wiltshire	Latin, Malmesbury	
1798			A.D. 675 x 690	Æthelheah, abbot of Icheanog (? Iken, Suffolk)	the nun Mildburg	Grant of land at Wimnicas (Much Wenlock, Shropshire), by the river Monnow, at Marund, Herefordshire, and in the disctric called Lydas (? Lyde, Herefordshire).	Much Wenlock	
1799			A.D. 674 x 704		Mildburg, their sister	Grant of land around Clee Hill, by the river Corve, at Kenbecleag, and in Chelmarsh, Shropshire.	Much Wenlock	
1800			A.D. 709 x 716	Ceolred, king of Mercia	Mildburg, abbess	Grant of land at Peandan Wrye (Wyre Piddle, Worcestershire).	Much Wenlock	
1801			A.D. 704 x 709	Cenred, king of Mercia	the nun Feleburg	Grant of land at Lingen (or Lye), Herefordshire	Much Wenlock	
1802			A.D. 727 x 736	Sigward, comes of king (Æthelbald of Mercia)	Mildburg, abbess	Grant of land at Madeley, Shropshire.	Much Wenlock	
1803	841		A.D. 675 x 692	Friduric, princeps of King Æthelred	St Peter’s, Medeshamstede	Grant of land at Breedon (on the Hill), Leicestershire	Latin, Peterborough	
1804	843		A.D. 675 x 692	Æthelred, king (of the Mercians)	Hædda, abbot of Breedon	Grant of land at Cedenan Ac (? Cadney, Lincolnshire).	Latin, Peterborough	
1805	842		A.D. 675 x 692	Friduric, princeps	Abbot Hædda	Grant of land at Hrepingas (? Rippingdale, Lincolnshire).	Latin, Peterborough	
1806	840		A.D. 675 x 692	Æthelred, king of Mercia	the minster of Medehamstede	Grant of land at Leugttricdun (? Laughterton, Lincolnshire).	Latin, Peterborough	
1807	1062		s. x 2	Ælfhelm and Affa, his wife	St Benedict’s Ramsey	Grant of land at Hatley and Potton, Bedfordshire	Latin, Ramsey	
1808	1061		s. x 2	Ælfhild, wife of Ælfwold, comes	the church of SS Mary and Benedict, Ramsey	Bequest of land at Ripton, Wennington, Ellington, Bythorn, Huntingdonshire; and to Almar, her chaplain, grant of land at Cloptona (Clapton, Northamptonshire), with reversion to the church of Ramsey.	Latin, Ramsey	
1809	1060		s. x 2	Æthelgifu, comitissa	the church of St Benedict, Ramsey	Grant of land at Stowe and at Bourn, Cambridgeshire	Latin, Ramsey	
1810	1059		A.D. 995 x 1001		St Benedict’ts, Ramsey	Bequest of land at Brancaster, Norfolk.	Latin, Ramsey	
1811	783		A.D. 963 for 943		(Wulfheah)	Grant of land at Langford, Wiltshire	Latin with English bounds, Wilton	
1812			A.D. 871 x 899		the church of Winchester	Concerning Chilcomb, Hampshire	English, Winchester, Old Minster	
1813			A.D. 943		the church of Winchester	Concerning land at Wolferdyngton.	Winchester, Old Minster	
1814			A.D. 959 x 975		Curdic, his minister	Grant of land at Exton, Hampshire	Winchester, Old Minster	
1816			A.D. 959 x 975		—	Concerning Little Hinton, Wiltshire	Winchester, Old Minster	
1817			A.D. 979		St Peter’s, Winchester	Memorandum of grant of land at Crondall, Hampshire	Latin, Winchester, Old Minster	
1818			A.D. 979 x 1016		—	Concerning 11 hides at East Oakley in Wootton St Lawrence, Hampshire	Winchester, Old Minster	
1819			circa A.D. 900			Note of grants of land at Nynehead, Stoke St Mary, Ruishton and Hestercombe, Somerset.	English, Winchester, Old Minster	
1822			A.D. 657 x 674	Wulfhere. king of Mercia	Colman, abbot	Grant of land at hanbury, Worcestershire	Latin, Worcester	
1823			A.D. 716 x 757	Æthelnald	Cyneberht, comes	Grant of land at Efanworthig or Esanworthig.	Worcester	
1824			A.D. 716 x 757	Æthelbald, king of Mercia	Eafe, a nun	Grant of part of a building and two salt-furnaces in vico emptorio salis (Droitwich, Worcestershire).	Latin, Worcester	
1825			A.D. 716 x 757	Æthelbald, king of Mercia	Henele	Grant of land at Hymelmore or Aethilmelmore (? near Himbleton, Worcestershire).	Latin, Worcester	
1826			A.D. 700 for AD 716 x 757	Æthelbald, king	—	Concerning Sture (in Usmere, near Kidderminster, Worcestershire) and Wolverley, Worcestershire	Latin, Worcester	
1827			A.D. 864 for 716 x 757	Æthelbald, king	—	Concerning land at Wolverley, Worcestershire	Latin, Worcester	
1828			A.D. 757 x 796	Offa, king	the church of Worcester	Grant of land at Northsture, Worcestershire	Latin, Worcester	
1829			A.D. 757 x 796		the church of Worcester	Reversionary grant of land at Sture, Worcestershire	Worcester	
1830			A.D. 774	Milred, bishop of the Hwicce	—	Concerning Tillho.	Latin, Worcester	
1831			A.D. 813 (? for 823)	Ceolwulf, king	—	Concerning Salwarpe, Worcestershire	Latin, Worcester	
1832			A.D. 814	Cenwulf, king of Mercia	Bosel	Grant of land.	Worcester	
1833			A.D. 844	Ealhhun (Alchun), bishop of Worcester	the church of Worcester	Confirmation of land belonging to the minster at Kempsey, Worcestershire, and of land at Bredon, Worcestershire	Latin and English, Worcester	
1834			A.D. 845 x 872	Ealhhun (Aldhuin), bishop	—	Concerning land to the west of the river Severn (? Bentleyt in Holi, Worcestershire).	Latin, Worcester	
1835			A.D. 848		—, with the consent of King Berhtwulf	Concerning Tomonwordig.	Latin, Worcester	
1836			A.D. 852	Berhtwulf, king of Mercia	Edgar, minister	Grant of land at Werburgstoke (near Harvington, Worcestershire).	Latin, Worcester	
1837			A.D. 873 x 915	Wærferth, bishop	—	Concerning land at Tredington, Warwickshire	Latin, Worcester	
1838			A.D. 873 x 915	Wærferth, bishop	—	Concerning Avenbury, Herefordshire	English, Worcester	
1839			A.D. 888		—	Concerning land at Pendock, Worcestershire	Latin, Worcester	
1841			A.D. 925 x 939		Æthelnoth, minister	Grant of land at Moreton in Bredon, Worcestershire	Latin and English, Worcester	
1842			A.D. 941		—	Concerning land at Broctune (Broughton in Belbroughton, Worcestershire) and at Stoce.	Latin, Worcester	
1843			A.D. 961 x 972	Oswald, bishop	—	Concerning land at Milcote, Warwickshire	Latin and English, Worcester	
1844			A.D. 970		Ely Abbey	Grant of land at Bishampton, Worcestershire	Latin and English, Worcester	
1845			A.D. 1003 x 1023	Wulfstan, archbishop of York and Worcester	—	Concerning land at Throckmorton, Worcestershire	Latin, Worcester	
1846			A.D. 1003 x 1023	Wulfstan, archbishop	—	Concerning Tidmington, Warwickshire	Latin and English, Worcester	
1847			A.D. 1017	Wulfstan, archbishop of York	—	Concerning land at Wolverhampton, Worcestershire	Latin and English, Worcester	
1848			A.D. 1016 x 1033	Leofsige, bishop	—	Concerning land at Wolverton, Worcestershire	English, Worcester	
1849			A.D. 1037	Lyfing, bishop	—	Concerning land at Redmarley D’Abitot, Gloucestershire	Latin and English, Worcester	
1850			A.D. 1038 x 1046	Lyfing, bishop	—	Concerning land at Offerton in Hindlip, Worcestershire	Worcester	
1851			A.D. 1038 x 1046	Lyfing, bishop	—	Concerning land at Caldingcote (Kinsham in Bredon, Worcestershire).	Latin and English, Worcester	
1852			A.D. 1038 x 1046	Lyfing, bishop	—	Concerning land at Evenlode, Gloucestershire	Latin and English, Worcester	
1853			A.D. 1038 x 1046	Lyfing, bishop	—	Concerning Penn Hall in Pensax, Worcestershire	English, Worcester	
1854			A.D. 1038 x 1046	Lyfing, bishop	—	Concerning land at Southam Delabere, Gloucestershire	Latin and English, Worcester	
1855			A.D. 1038 x 1046	Lyfing, bishop	—	Concerning land at Wdeton (? Wootton Wawen, Warwickshire).	Worcester	
1856			A.D. 1042 x 1046	Lyfing, bishop	—	By leave of king Edward; concerning land at Lench, Worcestershire	Latin, Worcester	
1857			A.D. 1052 x 1062	Ealdred, bishop	—	Concerning land at Pendock, Worcestershire	Latin and English, Worcester	
1859			circa A.D. 1000			Note of descent of lease of Batsford, Gloucestershire	English, Worcester	
1860			circa A.D. 1019			Fragment, containing the end of a lease (?) of 1 and a quarter hides to Ælfnoth.	Latin	
1862	480		A.D. 854	Æthelwulf, king of Wessex	?	Fragment of a grant of land.	Latin with English bounds, uncertain	
1864			Domesday.			Writ of King Edward the Confessor concerning the liability to geld of land at Rockbourn, Hampshire	Domesday	
1865			Domesday.			Writ of King Edward the Confessor concerning the grant of land at Rockbourn, Hants, to Sawin.	Domesday	
1866			Domesday.			Writ of King Edward the Confessor concerning the grant of land at Sparsholt, Berkshire, to Abingdon Abbey.	Domesday	
1867			Domesday.			Writ of King Edward the Confessor granting land at Woolhampton, Berkshire,	to Godricirca , Domesday	
1868			Domesday.			Writ of King Edward the Confessor concerning the restoration of land at Cheselbourne, Stour and Melcombe, Dorset, to Shaftesbury Abbey.	Domesday	
1869			Domesday.			Writ of King Edward the Confessor concerning the beneficial hidation of Lechlade, Gloucestershire	Domesday	
1870			No date.			Charter concerning the beneficial hidation of Ombersley, Worcestershire	Domesday	
1871			Domesday.			Writ of King Edward the Confessor concerning the possession of the church of St Mary, Huntingdon, by two priests of Huntingdon.	Domesday	
1872			Domesday.			Writ of King Edward the Confessor concerning the grant of Leofric and his land (at Orton, Huntingdonshire) to the bishopric of Lincoln.	Domesday	
1873			Domesday.			Writ of King Edward the Confessor concerning the possession of the canons of St John, Beverley.	Domesday	
1874			Domesday.			Writ of King Edward the Confessor concerning his reconciliation, after outlawry, with Edwin of Laxfield, permitting any freeman who wished to return to his commendation.	Domesday	
1875			Domesday.			Writ of King Edward the Confessor concerning the possession by the Abbey of Bury St Edmunds of the rights of sake, soke and commendation over the men of Stowe Hundred, Suffolk.	Domesday	
