= Blunderbore =

Giant of Cornish folklore

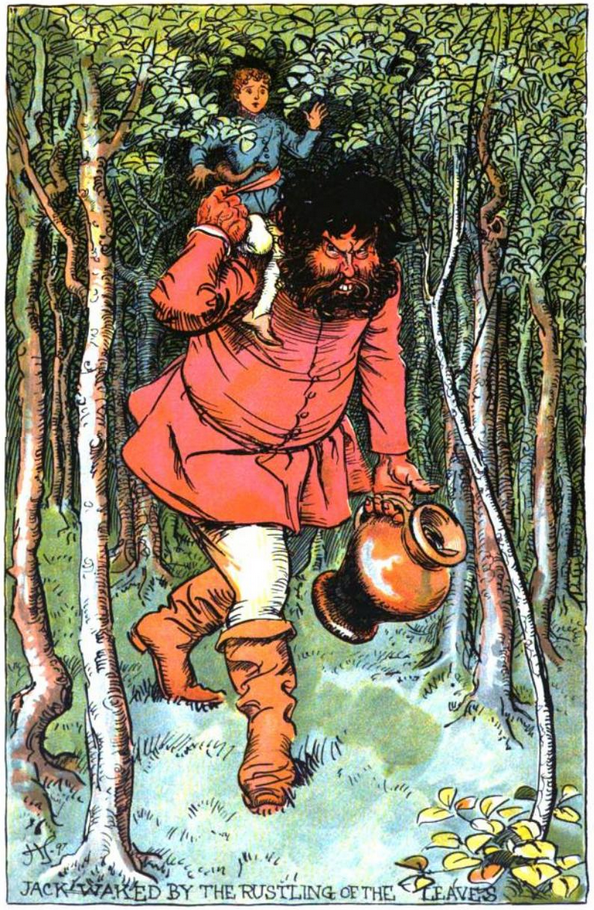
Jack the Giant Killer being carried away by Blunderbore, in an 1898 illustration by Hugh Thomson

Blunderbore (also recorded as Blunderboar, Thunderbore, Blunderbus, or Blunderbuss) is a giant of Cornish and English folklore. A number of folk and fairy tales include a giant named Blunderbore, most notably "Jack the Giant Killer". The stories usually associate him with the area of Penwith.

Cornish folklore remembers Blunderbore as living in Ludgvan Lese (a manor in Ludgvan), where he terrorized travelers heading north to St Ives. In "Jack the Giant Killer" he is the second or third giant (along with his brother Rebecks) killed by the hero Jack. Under the influence of that story, the name "Blunderbore" is frequently appropriated by other legendary giants; the later fairy tale "Tom the Tinkeard", a local Cornish variant of "Tom Hickathrift", contains a similar account of the hero's battle with a giant named Blunderbore. Likewise, it is usually given as the name of the ogre in "Jack and the Beanstalk".

== Appearances ==
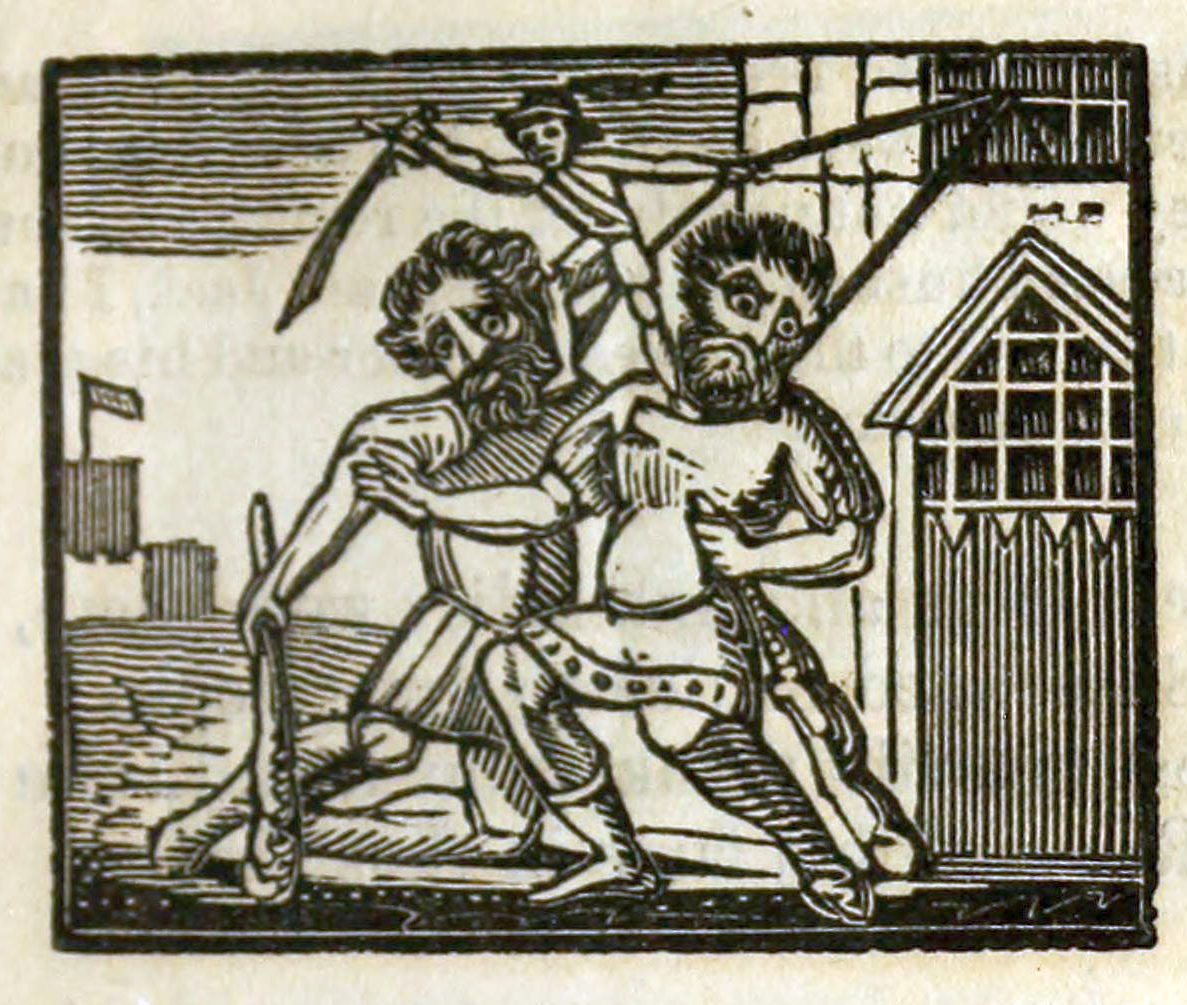
The giants Blunderbore and Rebecks are hanged by Jack (1820 chapbook illustration)

Blunderbore first appears in the fairy tale "Jack the Giant Killer". In the version recorded by Joseph Jacobs, Blunderbore lives in Penwith, where he kidnaps three lords and ladies, planning to eat the men and make the women his wives. When the women refuse to eat their husbands with the giant, he hangs them by their hair in his dungeon and leaves them to starve. Shortly, the hero Jack stops along the highway from Penwith to Wales to get a drink from a fountain and take a nap. Blunderbore discovers the sleeping Jack. Recognizing him by his labeled belt and having known of him killing Cormoran, carries him to his castle and locks him in a cell. While off inviting his friend Rebecks to come help him eat Jack, Jack creates nooses from some rope. When the giants arrive, he drops the nooses, slides down the rope, and slits their throats.

A giant named Blunderbore appears in the similar Cornish fairy tale "Tom the Tinkeard" (or "Tom the Tinkard"), a local variant of the more famous "Tom Hickathrift". Here, Blunderbore has built a hedge over the King's Highway between St Ives to Marazion, claiming the land as his own. The motif of the abduction of women appears in this version, as Blunderbore has kidnapped at least twenty women as his wives. The hero Tom awakes the giant from a nap while taking a wagon and oxen back from St Ives to Marazion. Blunderbore tears up an elm to swat Tom off his property, but Tom slides one of the axles from the wagon and uses it to fight and eventually fatally wound the giant. In his dying breaths, the giant confers all his wealth to Tom and requests a proper burial.

== In popular culture ==
Blunderbore appears as a monster type in the computer game Diablo II.
