= Cornish mythology =

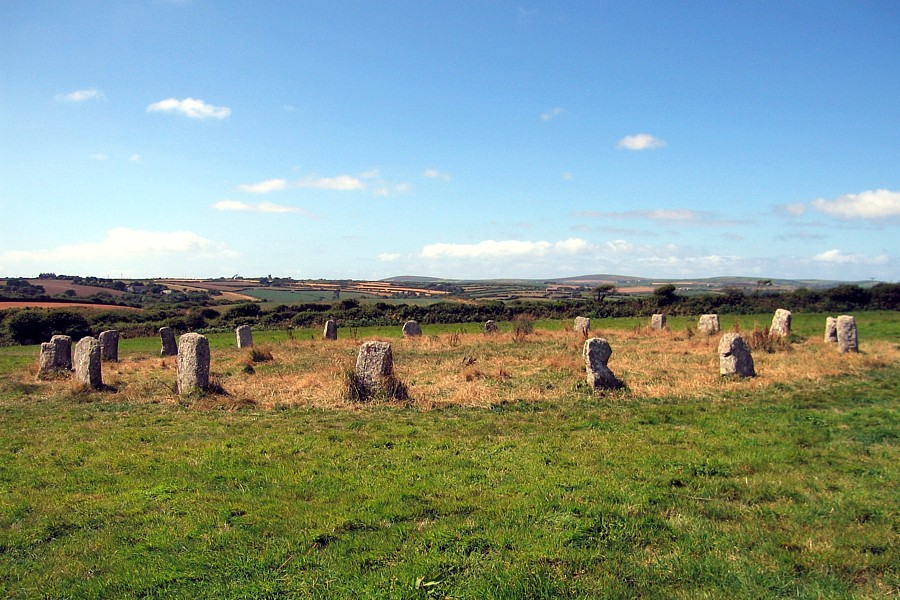
The Merry Maidens at St Buryan

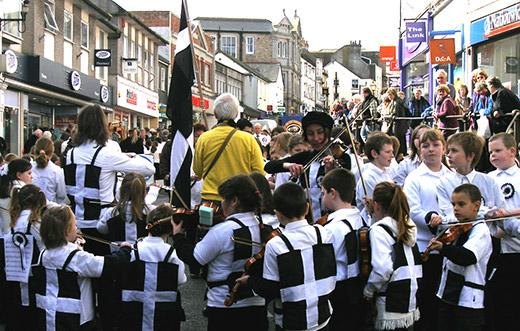
Celebration of St Piran's Day in Penzance

Cornish mythology is the folk tradition and mythology of the Cornish people. It consists partly of folk traditions developed in Cornwall and partly of traditions developed by Britons elsewhere before the end of the first millennium, often shared with those of the Breton and Welsh peoples. Some of this contains remnants of the mythology of pre-Christian Britain.

The folklore of Cornwall often consists of tales of giants, mermaids, Bucca, piskies or the 'pobel vean' (little folk.) These tales are still popular today, with some events hosting a 'droll teller' or storyteller, to share Cornish myths and legends. The myths and stories of Cornwall have found much publishing success, particularly in children's books. The fairy tale Jack the Giant Killer takes place in Cornwall. Many early British legends associate King Arthur with Cornwall, putting his birthplace at Tintagel, the court of King Mark of Cornwall, uncle of Tristan and husband of Iseult, the most famous Cornish lovers.

== Overview ==
Cornwall shares its ancient cultural heritage with its 'Brythonic cousins' Brittany and Wales, as well as Ireland and parts of England such as neighbouring Devon. Many ancient tales of the Bards, whether the Arthurian Cycle, Tristan and Iseult, or the Mabinogion take place in the ancient kingdom of Cerniw between Greater and Lesser Britains with a foot on either side of the 'British Sea' Mor Brettanek/Mor Breizh.

Part of Cornish mythology is derived from tales of seafaring pirates and smugglers who thrived in and around Cornwall from the early modern period through to the 19th century. Cornish pirates exploited both their knowledge of the Cornish coast as well as its sheltered creeks and hidden anchorages. For many fishing villages, loot and contraband provided by pirates supported a strong and secretive underground economy in Cornwall.

Legendary creatures that appear in Cornish folklore include buccas, knockers, Giants, and Pixies. Tales of these creatures are thought to have developed as supernatural explanations for the frequent and deadly cave-ins that occurred during 18th century Cornish tin mining, or else a creation of the oxygen-starved minds of exhausted miners who returned from the underground.

The knocker is said to be about two feet tall and grizzled, but not misshapen. They tend to live underground. Here they wear tiny versions of standard miner's garb and commit random mischief, such as stealing a miner's unattended tools and food. They were often cast a small offering of food – usually the crust of a pasty – to appease their malevolence.

Many landscape features, from the barren granite rock features on Bodmin Moor, to the dramatic cliff seascape, to the mystical form of St Michael's Mount are explained as the work of Giants and English tales such as the early eighteenth century Jack the Giant Killer may recall much older British folk traditions recorded elsewhere in medieval Welsh language manuscripts and closely related to the folk traditions of Dartmoor in neighbouring Devon.

There is a Cornish legend of the lost land of Lyonesse, supposedly lost to the sea in one night. It is claimed to represent the folk memory of the flooding of the Isles of Scilly and Mount's Bay near Penzance. For example, the Cornish name of St Michael's Mount is Karrek Loos y'n Koos, literally, "the grey rock in the wood". The Breton legend of Ys is a similar concept.

Old Michaelmas Day falls on 11 October (10 October according to some sources). According to an old legend, blackberries should not be picked after this date. This is because, so British folklore goes, Satan was banished from Heaven on this day, fell into a blackberry bush and cursed the brambles as he fell into them. In Cornwall, a similar legend prevails, according to which the devil urinated on them.

The midnight washerwomen

Les Lavandières or the Midnight Washerwomen are three old laundresses in Celtic mythology. In Wales and Cornwall, a passerby must avoid being seen by the washerwomen. If they do get seen, however, they are required to help wring out the sheets. If they twist the sheets in the same direction as the washerwomen, the individual's arms will be wrenched from their sockets and they will get pulled into the wet sheets and killed instantly. If, however, they twist in the opposite direction, the washerwomen are required to grant the person three wishes.

Weather lore

"Mist from the hill / Brings water for the mill; / Mist from the sea / Brings fine weather for me." "Lundy plain, Sign of rain" (current in north Cornwall where Lundy Island is normally visible).

== Enys Tregarthen ==
Nellie Sloggett of Padstow devoted much of her attention to Cornish folklore and legend. She collected and recorded many stories about the Piskey folk, fairies of Cornish myth and legend. She published most of her works in this category under her better-known pen-name of Enys Tregarthen.

== North Cornwall ==
Dozmary Pool is identified by some people with the lake in which, according to Arthurian legend, Sir Bedivere threw Excalibur to The Lady of the Lake. Another legend relating to the pool concerns Jan Tregeagle.

The Beast of Bodmin has been reported many times but never identified with certainty.

The Doom Bar at the mouth of the River Camel was, according to legend, created by the Mermaid of Padstow as a dying curse, after being shot by a sailor.

== Penwith ==
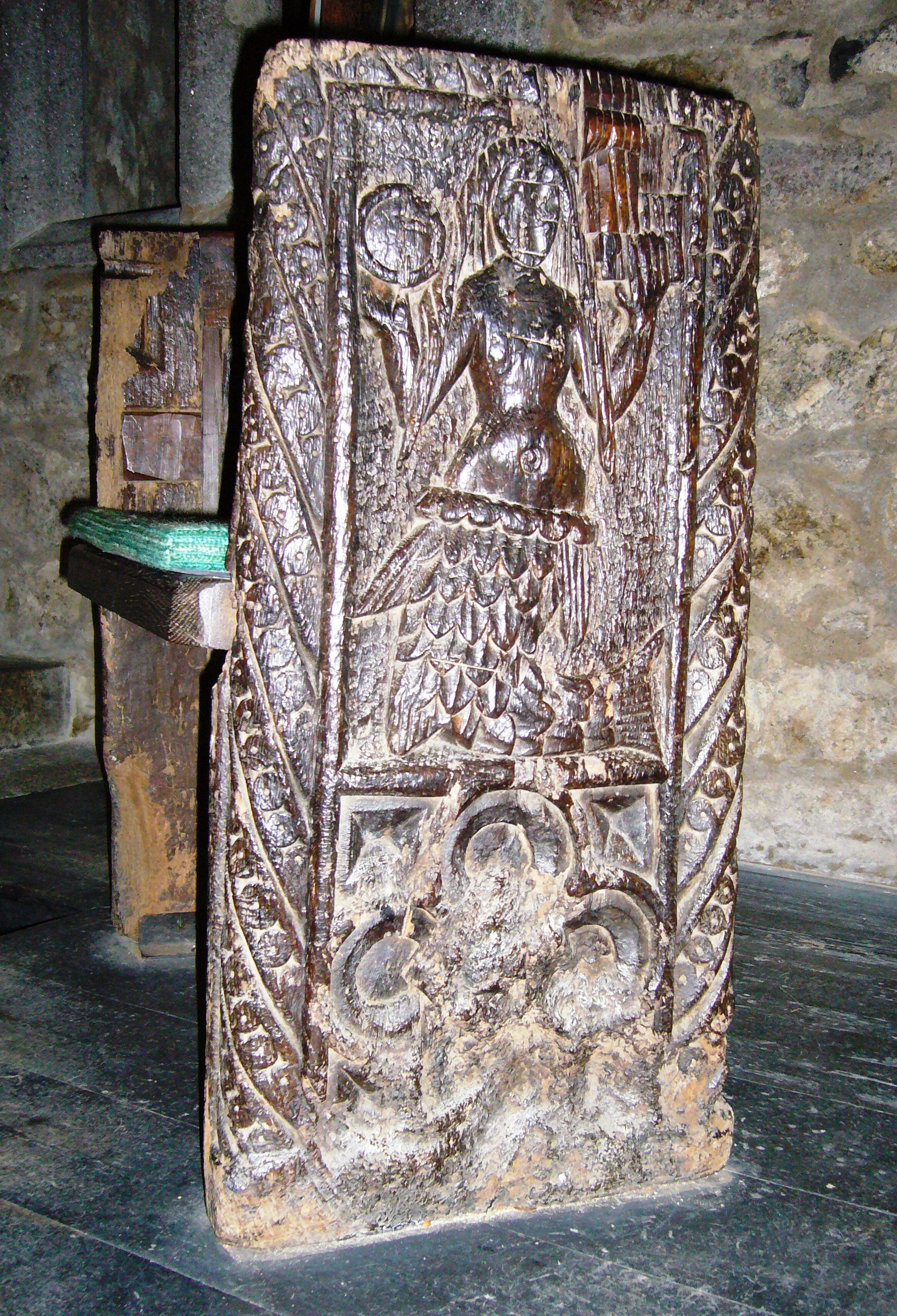
16th century Zennor mermaid bench end

The lantern Parade on Tom Bawcock's Eve

Within the bounds of Gulval parish lies the disused Ding Dong mine, reputedly one of the oldest in Cornwall. Popular local legend claims that Joseph of Arimathea, a tin trader, visited the mine and brought a young Jesus to address the miners, although there is no evidence to support this.

At Zennor, there is a legend of the Mermaid of Zennor and at Mousehole, Tom Bawcock is a legendary fisherman from the village who, according to legend, risked his life to go out and fish and managed to come back with enough fish to feed the village until the storm was over. All the fish was put into a big pie, and the pie called "Stargazy pie".

The Merry Maidens stone circle at St Buryan: the local myth about the creation of the stones suggests that nineteen maidens were turned into stone as punishment for dancing on a Sunday. (Dans Maen translates as Stone Dance.) The Pipers, two megaliths some distance north-east of the circle, are said to be the petrified remains of the musicians who played for the dancers. A more detailed story explains why the Pipers are so far from the Maidens – apparently the two pipers heard the church clock in St Buryan strike midnight, realised they were breaking the sabbath, and started to run up the hill away from the maidens who carried on dancing without accompaniment. These petrification legends are often associated with stone circles, and is reflected in the folk names of some of the nearby sites, for example, the Tregeseal Dancing Stones, the Nine Maidens of Boskednan, as well as the more distant Hurlers and The Pipers on Bodmin Moor.

== See also ==
- Cornish festivals
- Peter and the Piskies: Cornish Folk and Fairy Tales
- Culture of Cornwall
- Lyonesse & Ys – the Cornish & Breton Atlantis
- Matter of Britain
- Morgawr – the Cornish sea monster
- Bucca – the Spirit of the Sea

Wales and Brittany

- Breton mythology
- Hunting of Twrch Trwyth – the Cornish Boar of Welsh legend
- History of Brittany – the brother nation over the sea
- Welsh folklore
- Welsh mythology

Legendary people

- List of Cornish saints
- List of legendary rulers of Cornwall
- Arthur & Celliwig – PenDragon; 'Bear Chief Dragon' of the Britons
- Tristan and Iseult – a Cornish love story
- Jan Tregeagle
- Corineus – mythical founder of Cornwall
- Cormoran – the Giant and his wife of St Michael's Mount
- Jack the Giant Killer*Mark of Cornwall alias Conomor – the mythical and historical king; 'Hound of the Sea'
- Blunderbore
- Magnus Maximus / Macsen Wledig – historical late Roman emperor and mythical founder of Brittany

Collectors

- Gilbert Hunter Doble
- William Henry Paynter
