= Blunderbuss (disambiguation) =

A blunderbuss is a type of muzzle-loading firearm.

Blunderbuss may also refer to:

- Blunderbuss (album), a 2012 album by Jack White
- Blunderbuss, a 2004 EP by Teddy Thompson
- Blunderbore, a giant of Cornish folklore sometimes known as Blunderbuss
