= Jack the Giant Killer =

Cornish fairy tale and legend

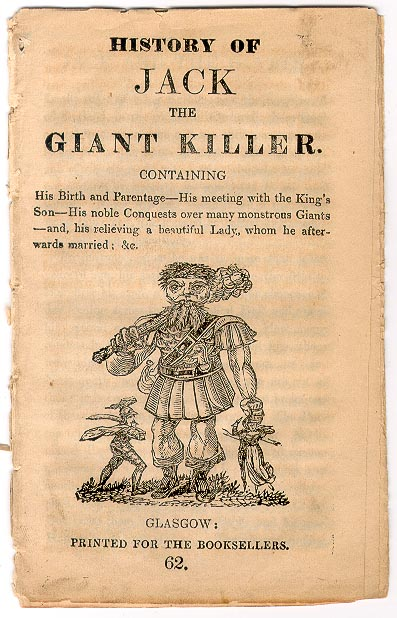
- Chapbook title page

Folk tale
- Name: Jack the Giant Killer
- Country: United Kingdom
- Published in: English Fairy Tales
- Related: Cornish folklore; Welsh mythology; Norse mythology; The Herd-boy and the Giant; The Valiant Little Tailor

"Jack the Giant Killer" is a Cornish fairy tale and legend about a man who slays a number of bad giants during King Arthur's reign. The tale is characterised by violence, gore and blood-letting. Giants are prominent in Cornish folklore, Breton mythology and Welsh Bardic lore. Some parallels to elements and incidents in Norse mythology have been detected in the tale, and the trappings of Jack's last adventure with the giant Galigantus suggest parallels with French and Breton fairy tales such as Bluebeard. Jack's belt is similar to the belt in "The Valiant Little Tailor", and his magical sword, shoes, cap, and cloak are similar to those owned by Tom Thumb or those found in Welsh and Norse mythology.

Jack and his tale are rarely referenced in English literature prior to the eighteenth century (there is an allusion to Jack the Giant Killer in William Shakespeare's King Lear, where in Act 3, one character, Edgar, in his feigned madness, cries, "Fie, foh, and fum,/ I smell the blood of a British man"). Jack's story did not appear in print until 1711. One scholar speculates the public had grown weary of King Arthur and Jack was created to fill the role. Henry Fielding, John Newbery, Samuel Johnson, Boswell, and William Cowper were familiar with the tale.

In 1962, a feature-length film based on the tale was released starring Kerwin Mathews. The film made extensive use of stop motion animation.

== Plot ==
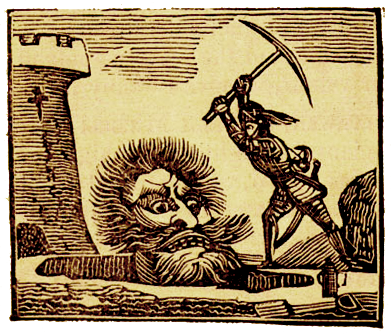
Jack kills Cormoran with a pick-axe

This plot summary is based on a text published c. 1760 by John Cotton and Joshua Eddowes, which in its turn was based on a chapbook c. 1711, and reprinted in The Classic Fairy Tales by Iona and Peter Opie in 1974. The tale is set during the reign of King Arthur and tells of a young Cornish farmer's son named Jack who is not only strong but so clever he easily confounds the learned with his penetrating wit. Jack encounters a livestock-eating giant called Cormoran (Cornish: 'The Giant of the Sea' SWF:Kowr-Mor-An) and lures him to his death in a pit trap. Jack is dubbed 'Jack the Giant-Killer' for this feat and receives not only the giant's wealth, but a sword and belt to commemorate the event.

A man-eating giant named Blunderbore vows vengeance for Cormoran's death and carries Jack off to an enchanted castle. Jack manages to slay Blunderbore and his brother Rebecks by hanging and stabbing them. He frees three ladies held captive in the giant's castle.

On a trip into Wales, Jack tricks an unnamed two-headed Welsh giant into slashing his own belly open. King Arthur's son now enters the story and Jack becomes his servant.

They spend the night with a three-headed giant and rob him in the morning. In gratitude for having spared his life and his castle, the three-headed giant gives Jack a magic sword, a cap of knowledge, a cloak of invisibility, and shoes of swiftness.

On the road, Jack and the Prince meet an enchanted Lady serving Lucifer. Jack breaks the spell with his magic accessories, beheads Lucifer, and the Lady marries the Prince. Jack is rewarded with membership in the Round Table.

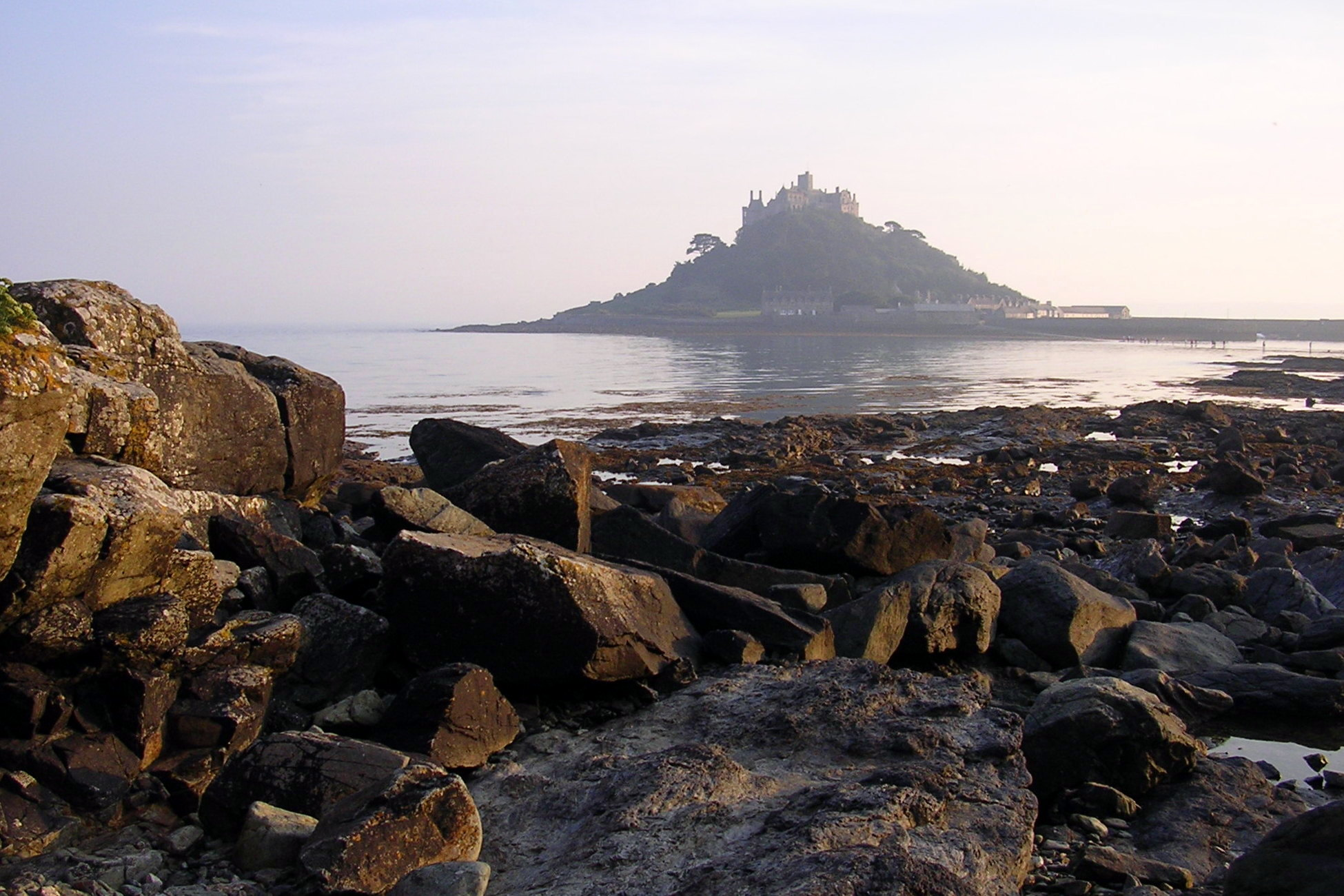
St Michael's Mount – home of the Giant

Jack ventures forth alone with his magic shoes, sword, cloak, and cap to rid the realm of troublesome giants. He encounters a giant terrorizing a knight and his lady. He cuts off the giant's legs, then puts him to death. He discovers the giant's companion in a cave. Invisible in his cloak, Jack cuts off the giant's nose then slays him by plunging his sword into the monster's back. He frees the giant's captives and returns to the house of the knight and lady he earlier had rescued.

A banquet is prepared, but it is interrupted by the two-headed giant Thunderdel chanting "Fee, fau, fum". Jack defeats and beheads the giant with a trick involving the house's moat and drawbridge.

Growing weary of the festivities, Jack sallies forth for more adventures and meets an elderly man who directs him to an enchanted castle belonging to the giant Galligantus (Galligantua, in the Joseph Jacobs version). The giant holds captive many knights and ladies and a Duke's daughter who has been transformed into a white doe through the power of a sorcerer. Jack beheads the giant, the sorcerer flees, the Duke's daughter is restored to her true shape, and the captives are freed.

At the court of King Arthur, Jack marries the Duke's daughter and the two are given an estate where they live happily ever after.

== Background ==
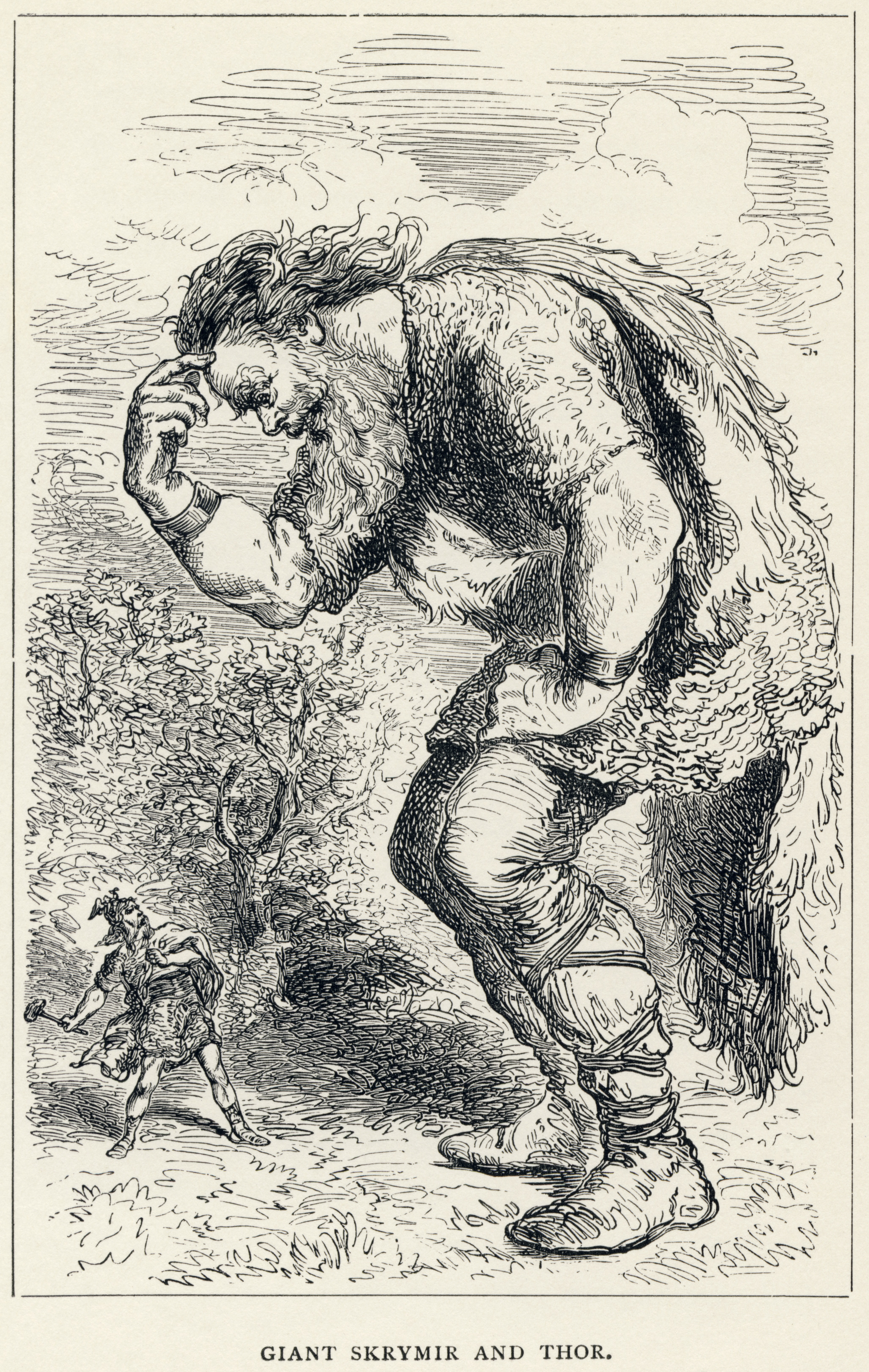
Thor and Skrymir

Tales of monsters and heroes are abundant around the world, making the source of "Jack the Giant Killer" difficult to pin down. However, the ascription of Jack's relation to Cornwall suggests a Brythonic (Celtic) origin. The early Welsh tale How Culhwch won Olwen (tentatively dated to c. 1100), set in Arthurian Britain places Arthur as chief among the kings of Britain. The young hero Culhwch ap Cilydd makes his way to his cousin Arthur's court at Celliwig in Cornwall where he demands Olwen as his bride; the beautiful daughter of the giant Ysbaddaden Ben Cawr ('Chief of Giants'). The Giant sets a series of impossible tasks which Arthur's champions Bedwyr and Cai are honour-bound to fulfill before Olwen is released to the lad; and the Giant King must die. Folklorists Iona and Peter Opie have observed in The Classic Fairy Tales (1974) that "the tenor of Jack's tale, and some of the details of more than one of his tricks with which he outwits the giants, have similarities with Norse mythology." An incident between Thor and the giant Skrymir in the Prose Edda of c. 1220, they note, resembles the incident between Jack and the stomach-slashing Welsh giant. The Opies further note that the Swedish tale of "The Herd-boy and the Giant" shows similarities to the same incident, and "shares an ancestor" with the Grimms's "The Valiant Little Tailor", a tale with wide distribution. According to the Opies, Jack's magical accessories – the cap of knowledge, the cloak of invisibility, the magic sword, and the shoes of swiftness – could have been borrowed from the tale of Tom Thumb or from Norse mythology, however older analogues in British Celtic lore such as Y Mabinogi and the tales of Gwyn ap Nudd, cognate with the Irish Fionn mac Cumhaill, suggest that these represent attributes of the earlier Celtic gods such as the shoes associated with Welsh Lleu Llaw Gyffes of the Fourth Branch, Arthur's invincible sword Caledfwlch and his Mantle of Invisibility Gwenn one of the Thirteen Treasures of the Island of Britain mentioned in two of the branches; or the similar cloak of Caswallawn in the Second Branch. Another parallel is the Greek demigod Perseus, who was given a magic sword, the winged sandals of Hermes and the 'cap of darkness' (borrowed from Hades) to slay the gorgon Medusa. Ruth B. Bottigheimer observes in The Oxford Companion to Fairy Tales that Jack's final adventure with Galigantus was influenced by the "magical devices" of French fairy tales. The Opies conclude that analogues from around the world "offer no surety of Jack's antiquity."

The Opies note that tales of giants were long known in Britain. King Arthur's encounter with the giant of St Michael's Mount – or Mont Saint-Michel in Brittany – was related by Geoffrey of Monmouth in Historia Regum Britanniae in 1136, and published by Sir Thomas Malory in 1485 in the fifth chapter of the fifth book of Le Morte d'Arthur:

Then came to [King Arthur] an husbandman ... and told him how there was ... a great giant which had slain, murdered and devoured much people of the country ... [Arthur journeyed to the Mount, discovered the giant roasting dead children,] ... and hailed him, saying ... [A]rise and dress thee, thou glutton, for this day shalt thou die of my hand. Then the glutton anon started up, and took a great club in his hand, and smote at the king that his coronal fell to the earth. And the king hit him again that he carved his belly and cut off his genitours, that his guts and his entrails fell down to the ground. Then the giant threw away his club, and caught the king in his arms that he crushed his ribs ... And then Arthur weltered and wrung, that he was other while under and another time above. And so weltering and wallowing they rolled down the hill till they came to the sea mark, and ever as they so weltered Arthur smote him with his dagger.

Anthropophagic giants are mentioned in The Complaynt of Scotland in 1549, the Opies note, and, in King Lear of 1605, they indicate, Shakespeare alludes to the Fee-fi-fo-fum chant (" ... fie, foh, and fumme, / I smell the blood of a British man"), making it certain he knew a tale of "blood-sniffing giants". Thomas Nashe also alluded to the chant in Have with You to Saffron-Walden, written nine years before King Lear; the earliest version can be found in The Red Ettin of 1528.

=== Bluebeard ===
The Opies observe that "no telling of the tale has been recorded in English oral tradition", and that no mention of the tale is made in sixteenth or seventeenth century literature, lending weight to the probability of the tale originating from the oral traditions of the Cornish (and/or Breton) 'droll teller'. The 17th century Franco-Breton tale of Bluebeard, however, contains parallels and cognates with the contemporary insular British tale of "Jack the Giant Killer", in particular the violently misogynistic character of Bluebeard (La Barbe bleue, published 1697) is now believed to ultimately derive in part from King Mark Conomor, the 6th century continental (and probable insular) British King of Domnonée / Dumnonia, associated in later folklore with both Cormoran of St Michael's Mount and Mont Saint Michel – the blue beard (a 'Celtic' marker of masculinity) is indicative of his otherworldly nature.

=== The History of Jack and the Giants ===
"The History of Jack and the Giants" (the earliest known edition) was published in two parts by J. White of Newcastle in 1711, the Opies indicate, but was not listed in catalogues or inventories of the period nor was Jack one of the folk heroes in the repertoire of Robert Powel (i.e., Martin Powell), a puppeteer established in Covent Garden. "Jack and the Giants" however is referenced in The Weekly Comedy of 22 January 1708, according to the Opies, and in the tenth number Terra-Filius in 1721.

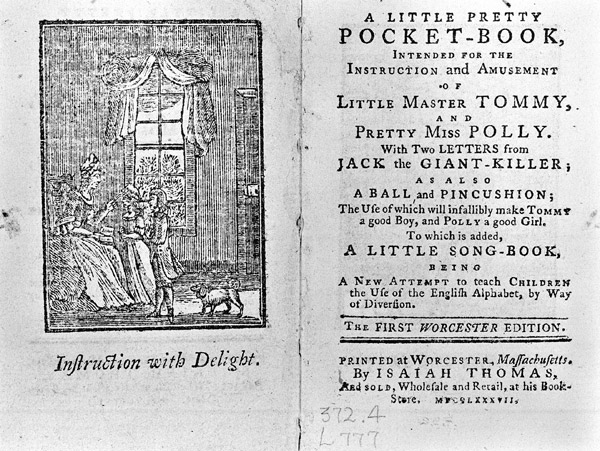
The title page from A Little Pretty Pocket-Book (1744) promises the reader two letters from Jack the Giant Killer.

As the eighteenth century wore on, Jack became a familiar figure. Research by the Opies indicate that the farce Jack the Giant-Killer was performed at the Haymarket in 1730; that John Newbery printed fictional letters about Jack in A Little Pretty Pocket-Book in 1744; and that a political satire, The last Speech of John Good, vulgarly called Jack the Giant-Queller, was printed c. 1745. The Opies and Bottigheimer both note that Henry Fielding alluded to Jack in Joseph Andrews (1742); Dr. Johnson admitted to reading the tale; Boswell read the tale in his boyhood; and William Cowper was another who mentioned the tale.

In "Jack and Arthur: An Introduction to Jack the Giant Killer", Thomas Green writes that Jack has no place in Cornish folklore, but was created at the beginning of the eighteenth century simply as a framing device for a series of gory, giant-killing adventures. The tales of Arthur precede and inform "Jack the Giant Killer", he notes, but points out that Le Morte d'Arthur had been out of print since 1634 and concludes from this fact that the public had grown weary of Arthur. Jack, he posits, was created to fill Arthur's shoes.

Bottigheimer notes that in the southern Appalachians of the United States, Jack became a generic hero of tales usually adapted from the Brothers Grimm. She points out however that "Jack the Giant Killer" is rendered directly from the chapbooks except the English hasty pudding in the incident of the belly-slashing Welsh giant becomes mush.

Child psychologist Bruno Bettelheim observes in The Uses of Enchantment: The Meaning and Importance of Fairy Tales (1976) that children may experience "grown-ups" as frightening giants, but stories such as "Jack" teach them that they can outsmart the giants and can "get the better of them". Bettelheim observes that a parent may be reluctant to read a story to a child about adults being outsmarted by children, but notes that the child understands intuitively that, in reading him the tale, the parent has given his approval for "playing with the idea of getting the better of giants", and of retaliating "in fantasy for the threat which adult dominance entails".

== British giants ==
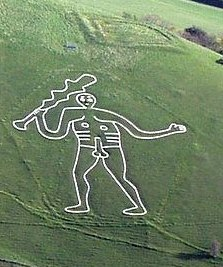
Cerne Abbas Giant in Dorset was probably carved about 700-1100CE.

John Matthews writes in Taliesin: Shamanism and the Bardic Mysteries in Britain and Ireland (1992) that giants are very common throughout British folklore, and often represent the "original" inhabitants, ancestors, or gods of the island before the coming of "civilised man", their gigantic stature reflecting their "otherworldly" nature. Giants figure prominently in Cornish, Breton and Welsh folklore, and in common with many animist belief systems, they represent the force of nature. The modern Standard Written Form in Cornish is Kowr singular (mutating to Gowr), Kewri plural, transcribed into Late Cornish as Gour, "Goë", "Cor" or similar. They are often responsible for the creation of the natural landscape, and are often petrified in death, a particularly recurrent theme in Celtic myth and folklore. An obscure Count of Brittany was named Gourmaëlon ruling from 908 to 913 and may be an alternative source of the Giant's name Cormoran, or Gourmaillon, translated by Joseph Loth as "he of the brown eyebrows".

The foundation myth of Cornwall originates with the early Brythonic chronicler Nennius in the Historia Brittonum and made its way, via Geoffrey of Monmouth into Early Modern English canon where it was absorbed by the Elizabethans as the tale of King Leir alongside that of Cymbeline and King Arthur, other mythical British kings. Carol Rose reports in Giants, Monsters, and Dragons that the tale of Jack the Giant Killer may be a development of the Corineus and Gogmagog legend. The motifs are echoed in the Hunting of Twrch Trwyth.

In 1136, Geoffrey of Monmouth reported in the first book of his imaginative The History of the Kings of Britain that the indigenous giants of Cornwall were slaughtered by Brutus, the (eponymous founder of Great Britain), Corineus (eponymous founder of Cornwall) and his brothers who had settled in Britain after the Trojan War. Following the defeat of the giants, their leader Gogmagog wrestled with the warrior Corineus, and was killed when Corineus threw him from a cliff into the sea:

For it was a diversion to him [Corineus] to encounter the said giants, which were in greater numbers there than in all the other provinces that fell to the share of his companions. Among the rest was one detestable monster, named Goëmagot [Gogmagog], in stature twelve cubits [6.5 m], and of such prodigious strength that at one shake he pulled up an oak as if it had been a hazel wand. On a certain day, when Brutus (founder of Britain and Corineus' overlord) was holding a solemn festival to the gods, in the port where they at first landed, this giant with twenty more of his companions came in upon the Britons, among whom he made a dreadful slaughter. But the Britons at last assembling together in a body, put them to the rout, and killed them every one but Goëmagot. Brutus had given orders to have him preserved alive, out of a desire to see a combat between him and Corineus, who took a great pleasure in such encounters. Corineus, overjoyed at this, prepared himself, and throwing aside his arms, challenged him to wrestle with him. At the beginning of the encounter, Corineus and the giant, standing, front to front, held each other strongly in their arms, and panted aloud for breath, but Goëmagot presently grasping Corineus with all his might, broke three of his ribs, two on his right side and one on his left. At which Corineus, highly enraged, roused up his whole strength, and snatching him upon his shoulders, ran with him, as fast as the weight would allow him, to the next shore, and there getting upon the top of a high rock, hurled down the savage monster into the sea; where falling on the sides of craggy rocks, he was torn to pieces, and coloured the waves with his blood. The place where he fell, taking its name from the giant's fall, is called Lam Goëmagot, that is, Goëmagot's Leap, to this day.

The match is traditionally presumed to have occurred at Plymouth Hoe on the Cornish-Devon border, although Rame Head is a nearby alternative location. In the early seventeenth century, Richard Carew reported a carved chalk figure of a giant at the site in the first book of The Survey of Cornwall:

Againe, the activitie of Devon and Cornishmen, in this facultie of wrastling, beyond those of other Shires, dooth seeme to derive them a speciall pedigree, from that graund wrastler Corineus. Moreover, upon the Hawe at Plymmouth, there is cut out in the ground, the pourtrayture of two men, the one bigger, the other lesser, with Clubbes in their hands, (whom they terme Gog-Magog) and (as I have learned) it is renewed by order of the Townesmen, when cause requireth, which should inferre the same to bee a monument of some moment. And lastly the place, having a steepe cliffe adjoyning, affordeth an oportunitie to the fact.

Cormoran (sometimes Cormilan, Cormelian, Gormillan, or Gourmaillon) is the first giant slain by Jack. Cormoran and his wife, the giantess Cormelian, are particularly associated with St Michael's Mount, apparently an ancient pre-Christian site of worship. According to Cornish legend, the couple were responsible for its construction by carrying granite from the West Penwith Moors to the current location of the Mount. When Cormoran fell asleep from exhaustion, his wife tried to sneak a greenschist slab from a shorter distance away. Cormoran awoke and kicked the stone out of her apron, where it fell to form the island of Chapel Rock. Trecobben, the giant of Trencrom Hill (near St Ives), accidentally killed Cormelian when he threw a hammer over to the Mount for Cormoran's use. The giantess was buried beneath Chapel Rock.

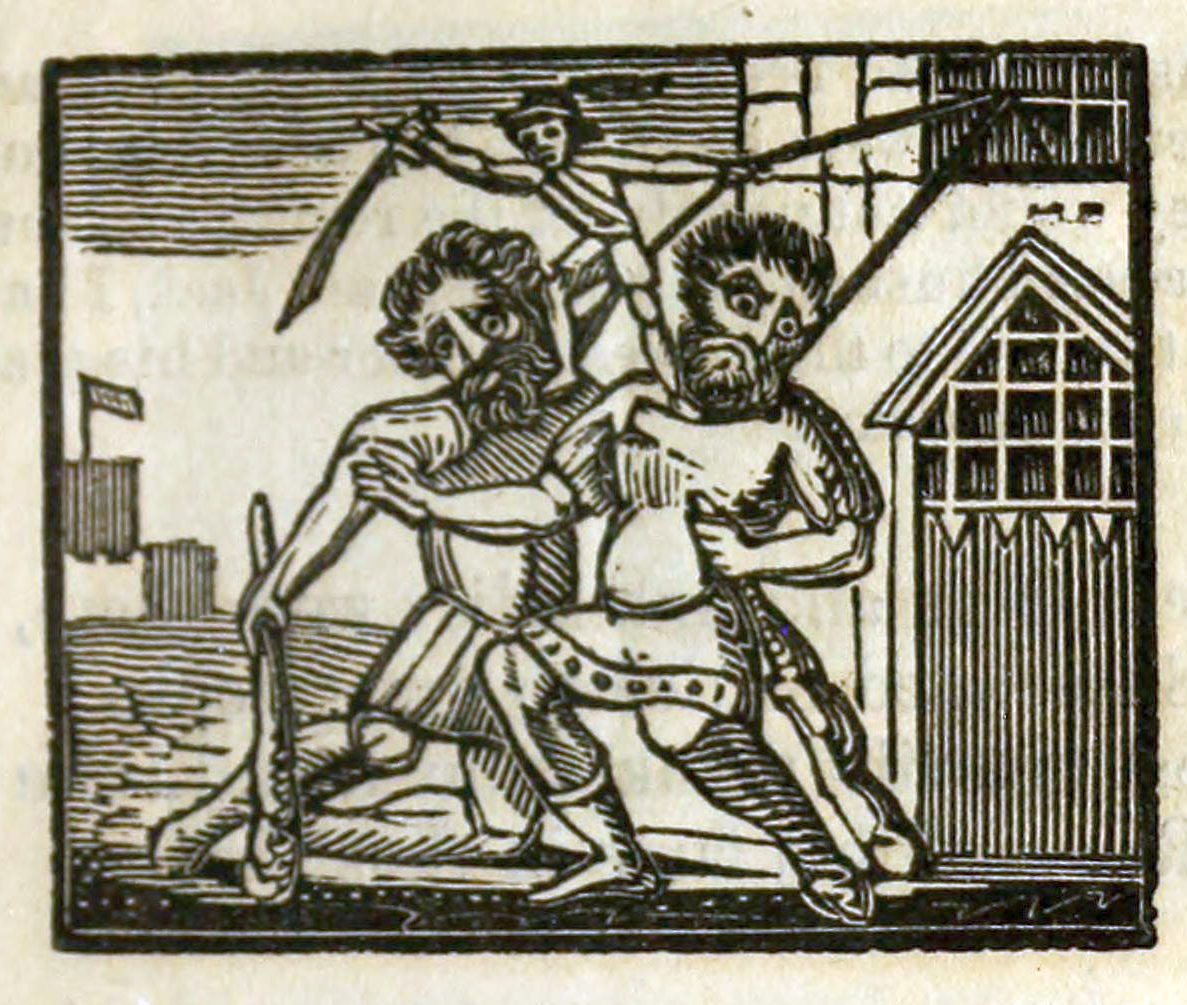
Jack hangs the giants Blunderbore and Rebecks

Blunderbore (sometimes Blunderboar, Thunderbore, Blunderbus, or Blunderbuss) is usually associated with the area of Penwith, and was living in Ludgvan Lese (a manor in Ludgvan), where he terrorised travellers heading north to St Ives. The Anglo-Germanic name 'Blunderbore' is sometimes appropriated by other giants, as in "Tom the Tinkeard" and in some versions of "Jack and the Beanstalk" and "Molly Whuppie". In the version of "Jack the Giant Killer" recorded by Joseph Jacobs, Blunderbore lives in Penwith, where he kidnaps three lords and ladies, planning to eat the men and make the women his wives. When the women refuse to consume their husbands in company with the giant, he hangs them by their hair in his dungeon and leaves them to starve. Shortly, Jack stops along the highway from Penwith to Wales. He drinks from a fountain and takes a nap (a device common in Brythonic Celtic stories, such as the Mabinogion). Blunderbore discovers the sleeping Jack, and recognising him by his labelled belt, carries him to his castle and locks him in a cell. While Blunderbore is off inviting a fellow giant to come help him eat Jack, Jack creates nooses from some rope. When the giants arrive, he drops the nooses around their necks, ties the rope to a beam, slides down the rope, and slits their throats. A giant named Blunderbore appears in the similar Cornish fairy tale "Tom the Tinkeard" (or "Tom the Tinkard"), a local variant of "Tom Hickathrift". Here, Blunderbore has built a hedge over the King's Highway between St Ives and Marazion, claiming the land as his own. The motif of the abduction of women appears in this version, as Blunderbore has kidnapped at least twenty women to be his wives. The hero Tom rouses the giant from a nap while taking a wagon and oxen back from St Ives to Marazion. Blunderbore tears up an elm to swat Tom off his property, but Tom slides one of the axles from the wagon and uses it to fight and eventually fatally wound the giant. The dying giant confers all his wealth to Tom and requests a proper burial.

Thunderdell is a two-headed giant that crashes a banquet that is prepared for Jack.

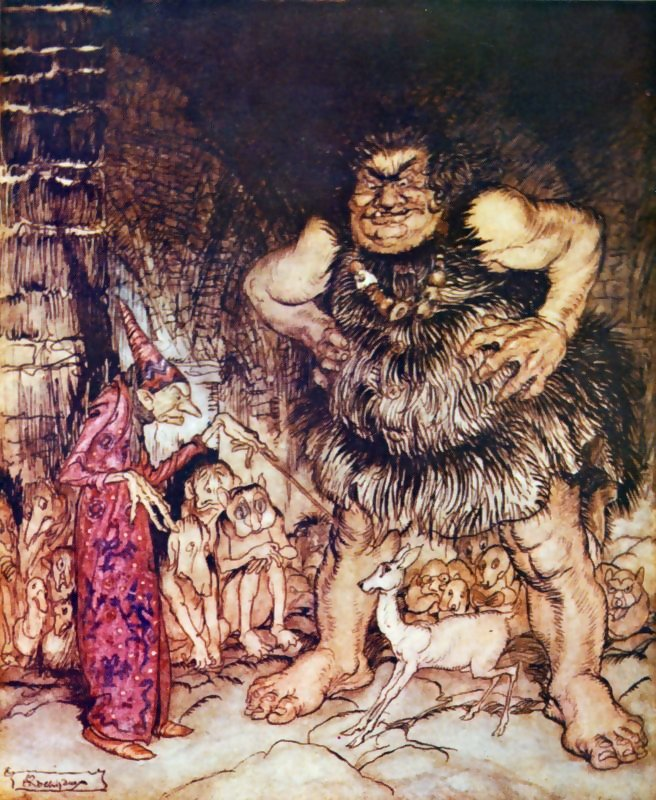
In an illustration by Arthur Rackham, Galligantus and the sorcerer transform the Duke's daughter into a white doe

Galligantus is a giant who holds captive many knights and ladies and a Duke's daughter who has been transformed into a white doe through the power of a sorcerer. Jack beheads the giant, the sorcerer flees, the Duke's daughter is restored to her true shape, and the captives are freed.

== H. G. Wells ==
in the 1904 novel The Food of the Gods and How It Came to Earth, H. G. Wells depicted the appearance of giants in the concrete reality of early 20th-century Britain. The giants arouse increasing hostility and prejudice, eventually leading to a rabble-rousing politician named Caterham forming an "Anti-Giant Party" and sweeping to power; the ambitious Caterham takes the nickname "Jack the Giant Killer", derived from the above tale. Unlike that tale, however, in Wells' depiction the giants are depicted sympathetically, as well-meaning innocents unjustly persecuted while the "Giant Killer" is the book's villain.

== Adaptations ==
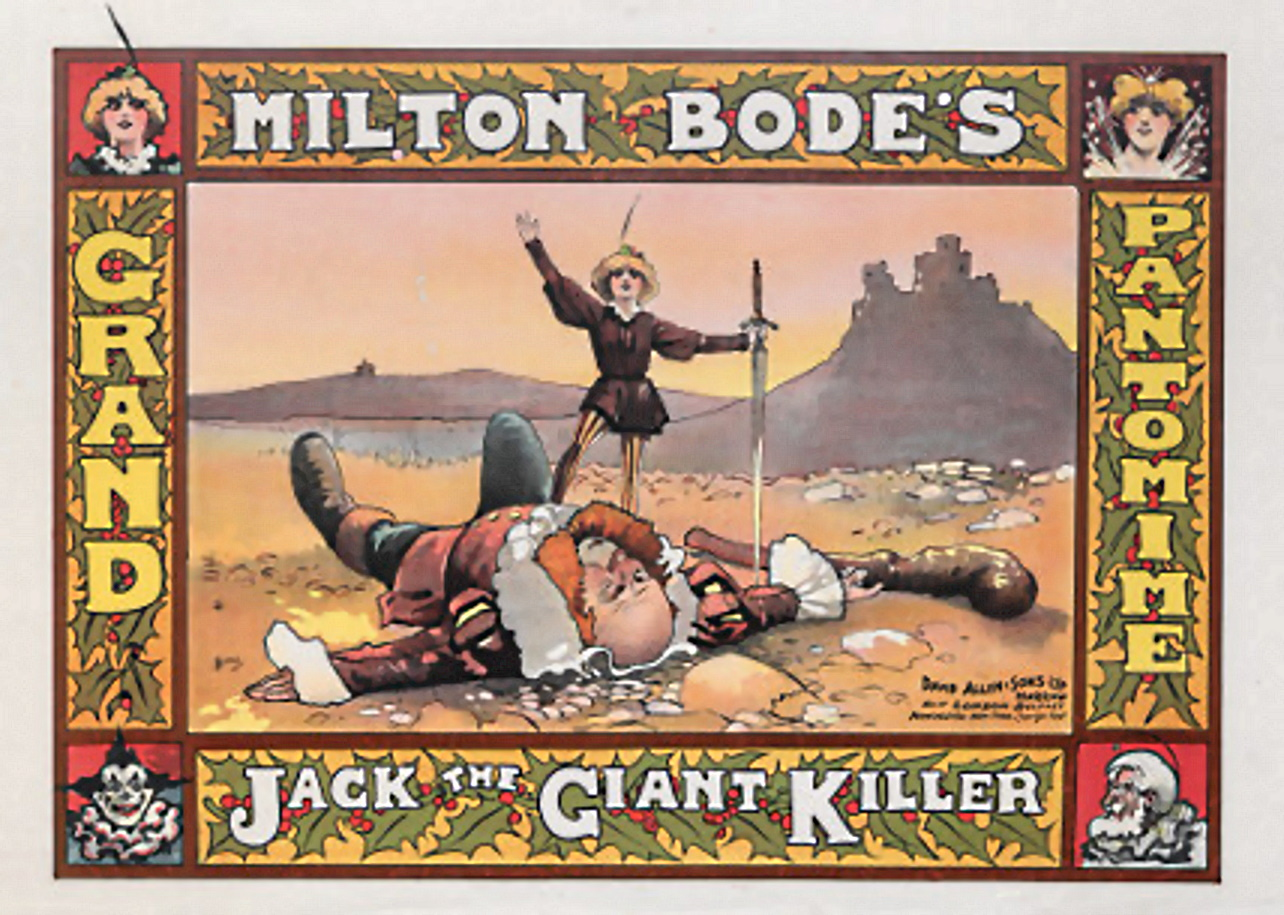
Poster by John Hassall for Milton Bode's Grand Pantomime, Jack the Giant Killer, c.1938 or prior

=== Films ===
==== 1962 film ====
In 1962, United Artists released a middle-budget film produced by Edward Small and directed by Nathan H. Juran called Jack the Giant Killer. Kerwin Mathews stars as Jack and Torin Thatcher as the sorcerer Pendragon.

==== Jack the Giant Slayer ====
The film Jack the Giant Slayer, directed by Bryan Singer and starring Nicholas Hoult was produced by Legendary Pictures and was released on 1 March 2013. It is a very loose adaption of both "Jack and the Beanstalk" and "Jack the Giant Killer".

==== 2013 film ====
The direct-to video film Jack the Giant Killer is a 2013 American fantasy film produced by The Asylum and directed by Mark Atkins. A modern take of the fairy tales Jack the Giant Killer and Jack and the Beanstalk, the film stars Ben Cross and Jane March. It is a mockbuster of Jack the Giant Slayer. It was released on DVD in the UK as The Giant Killer.

=== Video game ===
Jack the Giantkiller is a 1982 arcade game developed and published by Cinematronics. It is based on the 19th-century English fairy tale Jack and the Beanstalk. In Japan, the game was released as Treasure Hunt. There were no home console ports.

== See also ==
- Jack and the Beanstalk
