= Tilney All Saints =

Civil parish in Norfolk, England

Coordinates: 52.737955°N 0.320663°E

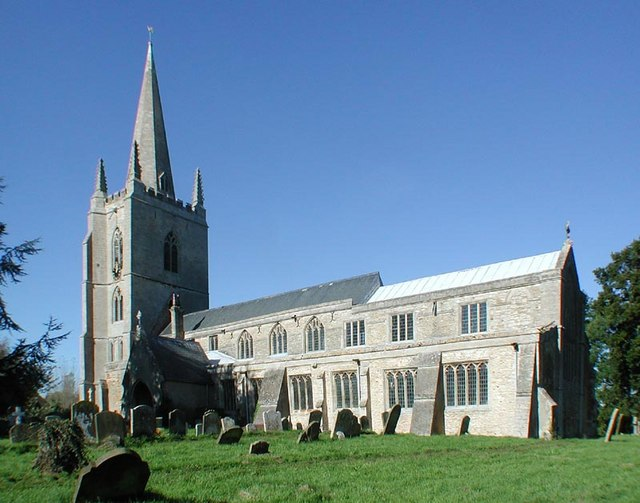
- All Saints, Tilney All Saints

- Location within Norfolk
- Area: 11.56 km^{2} (4.46 sq mi)
- Population: 573 (2011)
  - Density: 50/km^{2} (130/sq mi)
- OS grid reference: TF567181
- Civil parish: Tilney All Saints
- District: King's Lynn and West Norfolk
- Shire county: Norfolk
- Region: East
- Country: England
- Sovereign state: United Kingdom
- Post town: KING'S LYNN
- Postcode district: PE34
- Police: Norfolk
- Fire: Norfolk
- Ambulance: East of England

Tilney All Saints is a civil parish in the English county of Norfolk. It covers an area of 11.56 km^{2} (4.46 sq mi) and had a population of 563 in 230 households at the 2001 census, increasing to 573 at the 2011 Census. For the purposes of local government, it falls within the district of King's Lynn and West Norfolk.

The village's name origin is uncertain. 'Useful island' or 'Tila's island'.

The Church of All Saints is a Grade I listed building.

== See also ==
- Tilney St Lawrence
- Tom Hickathrift

== Notes ==
http://kepn.nottingham.ac.uk/map/place/Norfolk/Tilney%20All%20Saints
