= St Michael's Mount =

Tidal island in Mount's Bay, Cornwall, England

Coordinates: 50.1160°N 5.4772°W

St Michael's Mount: Cornish: Karrek Loos yn Koos
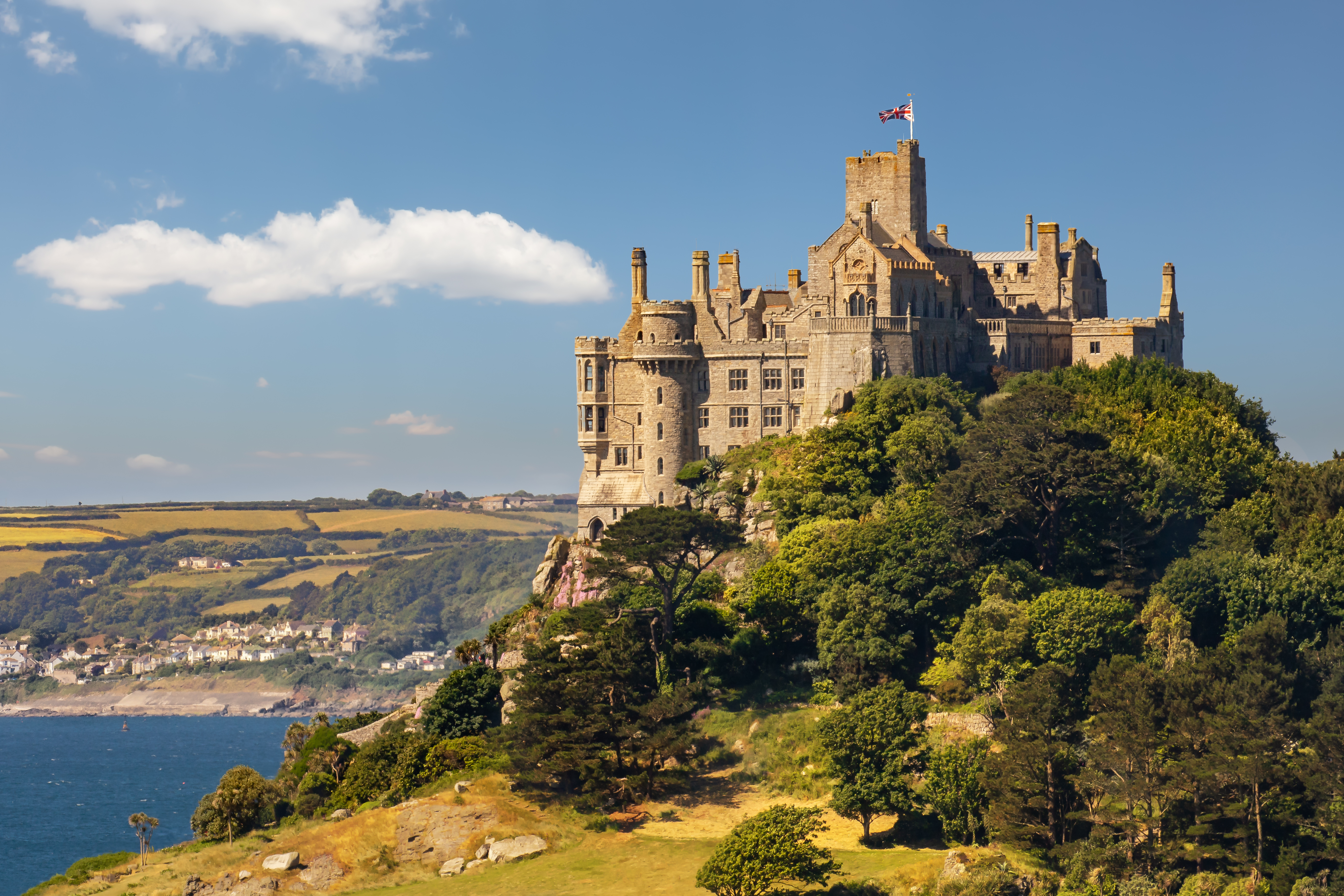
- St Michael's Mount

- Location within Cornwall
- Area: 0.09 sq mi (0.23 km^{2})
- OS grid reference: SW514298
  - London: 290 miles (467 km)
- Civil parish: St Michael's Mount
- Unitary authority: Cornwall
- Ceremonial county: Cornwall
- Region: South West
- Country: England
- Sovereign state: United Kingdom
- Post town: MARAZION
- Postcode district: TR17
- Dialling code: 01736
- Police: Devon and Cornwall
- Fire: Cornwall
- Ambulance: South Western
- UK Parliament: St Ives
- Website: www.stmichaelsmount.co.uk

Listed Building – Grade I
- Designated: 9 October 1987
- Reference no.: 1143795

National Register of Historic Parks and Gardens
- Designated: 11 June 1987
- Reference no.: 1000654

St Michael's Mount (Cornish: Karrek Loos yn Koos, meaning grey rock in the woodland) is a tidal island in Mount's Bay, near Penzance, in Cornwall, England. The island is a civil parish and is linked to the town of Marazion by a causeway of granite setts, passable (as is the beach) between mid-tide and low water. It is managed by the National Trust, and the castle and chapel have been the home of the St Aubyn family since around 1650.

Historically, St Michael's Mount was an English counterpart of Mont-Saint-Michel in Normandy, France, which is also a tidal island; it has a similar conical shape, though Mont-Saint-Michel is much taller. It is one of 43 unbridged tidal islands accessible by foot from mainland Britain. Part of the island was designated as a Site of Special Scientific Interest in 1995 for its geology. Sea height can vary by up to around 5 metres (16 ft) between low and high tide.

== Etymology ==
Its Cornish language name, literally "the grey rock in a wood", may represent a folk memory of a time before Mount's Bay was flooded, indicating a description of the mount set in woodland. Remains of ancient trees uncovered by storms have been seen at low tides in Mount's Bay, which was submerged in 1700 BC.

== Prehistory ==
There is evidence of people living in the area during the Neolithic between around 4000 and 2500 BC. The key discovery was of a leaf-shaped flint arrowhead in a shallow pit on the lower eastern slope, now part of the gardens. Other pieces of flint have been found and at least two could be Mesolithic (about 8000 to 4000 BC). During the early Mesolithic, Britain was still attached to mainland Europe across the southern North Sea between Kent and East Yorkshire (see Doggerland) but by the Neolithic, because of rising sea level, had become an island. Archaeologist and prehistorian Caroline Malone has noted that during the Late Mesolithic the British Isles were something of a "technological backwater" in European terms, still living as a hunter-gatherer society whilst most of southern Europe had already taken up agriculture and sedentary living. The mount was then probably an area of dry ground surrounded by a marshy forest. Any Neolithic or Mesolithic camps are likely to have been destroyed by the later extensive building operations, but it is reasonable to expect the mount to have supported a seasonal or short-term camp.

None of the flints so far recovered can be positively dated to the Bronze Age (c. 2500 to 800 BC), although any summit cairns would have most likely been destroyed when the castle was built. Radiocarbon dating established the submerging of the hazel wood at about 1700 BC. A hoard of copper weapons, once thought to have been found on the mount, are now thought to have been found on nearby Marazion Marsh. Defensive stony banks on the north-eastern slopes are likely to date to the early first millennium BC, and are considered to be a cliff castle. The mount is one of several candidates for the island of Ictis, described as a tin trading centre in the Bibliotheca historica of the Sicilian-Greek historian Diodorus Siculus, writing in the first century BC.

== History ==
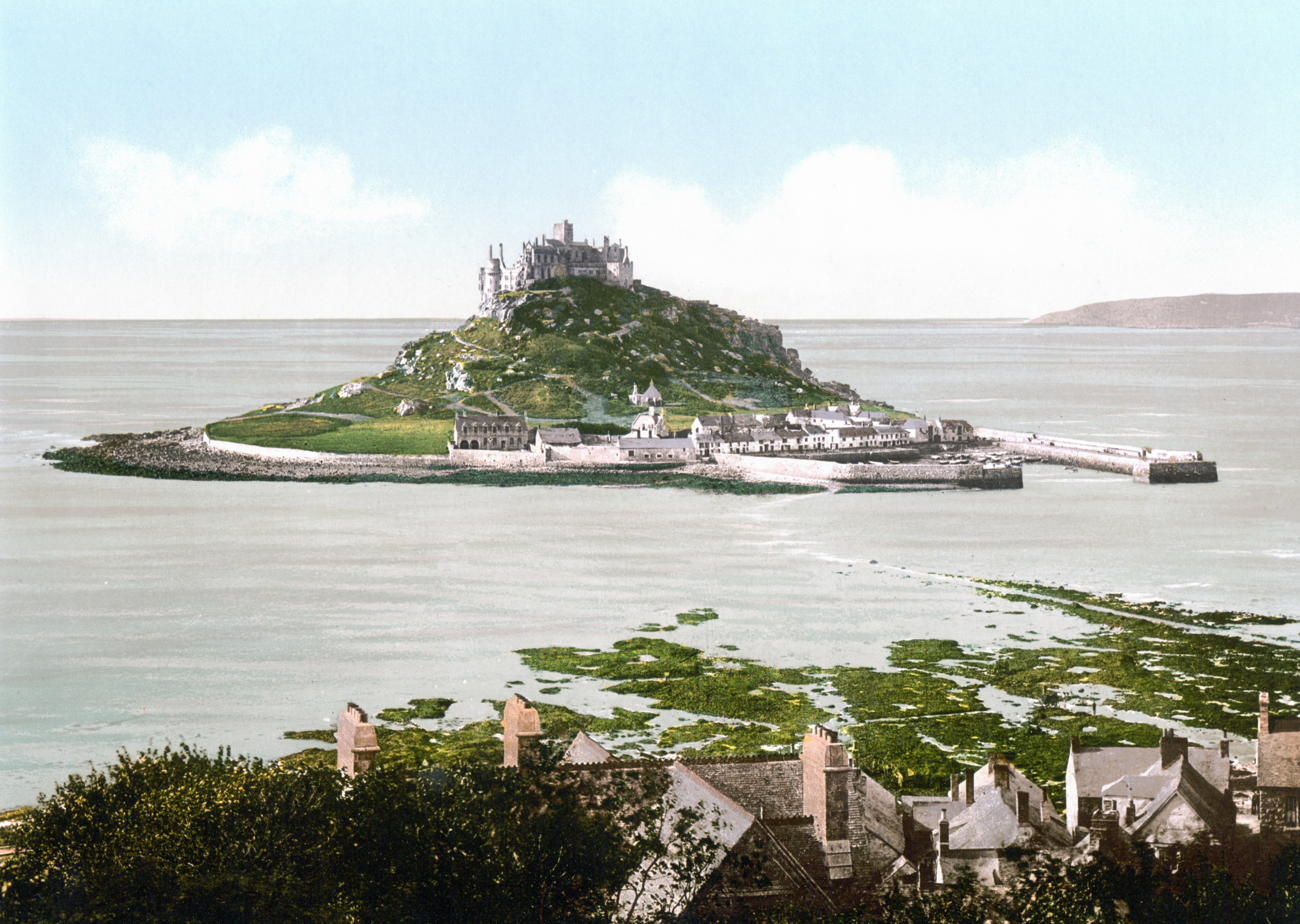
St Michael's Mount in 1900

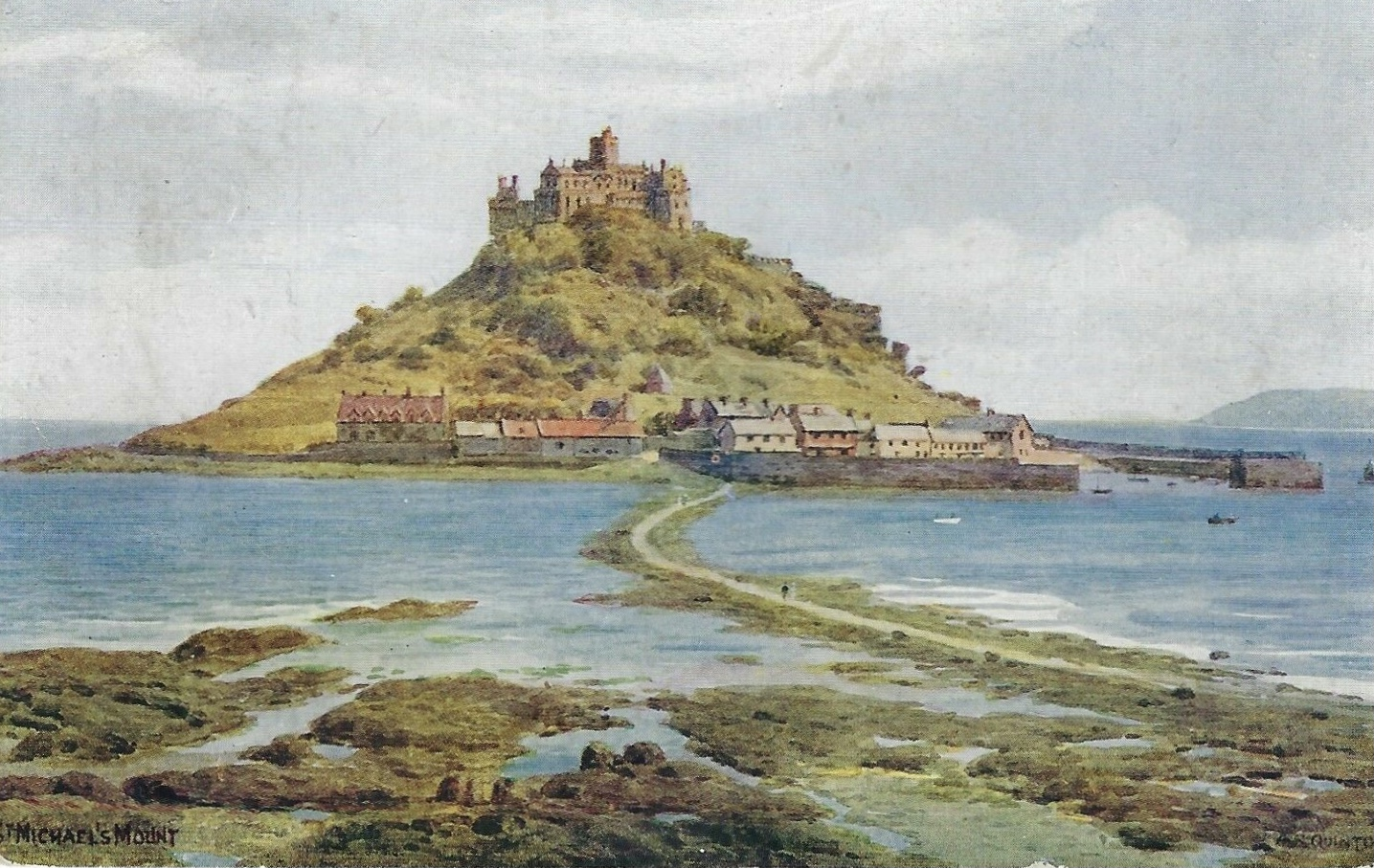
St Michael's Mount (postcard c. 1920) by A. R. Quinton

St Michael's Mount may have been the site of a monastery from the 8th to the early 11th centuries. Edward the Confessor gave the site to the Benedictine order of Mont-Saint-Michel. In 967 AD King Edgar granted to Wulfnoth Rumuncant land in the Charter of Lesneague and Pennarth. Lesneague, together with Traboe, was later granted to the Benedictine monks of St Michael's Mount by Robert Count of Mortain. It was a priory of that Mont-Saint-Michel until the dissolution of the alien houses as a side-effect of the war in France by Henry V.

Subsequently, it ceased to be a priory but was reduced to being a secular chapel which was given to the Abbess and Convent of Syon at Isleworth, Middlesex, in 1424. Thus ended its association with Mont-Saint-Michel, and any connection with Looe Island (dedicated to the Archangel Michael). It was a destination for pilgrims, whose devotions were encouraged by an indulgence granted by Pope Gregory VII in the 11th century. The earliest buildings on the summit, including a castle, date to the 12th century.

=== Siege, occupation and ownership ===
Sir Henry de la Pomeroy captured the Mount in 1193, on behalf of Prince John, in the reign of Richard I, the leader of the previous occupants having 'died of fright' upon learning rumours of Richard's release from captivity. The monastic buildings were built during the 12th century. Various sources state that the earthquake of 1275 destroyed the original Priory church, although this may be a misunderstanding of the term "St Michael's on the Mount" which referred to the church of St Michael atop Glastonbury Tor. Syon Abbey, a monastery of the Bridgettine Order, acquired the Mount in 1424. Some 20 years later the Mount was granted by Henry VI to King's College, Cambridge on its foundation. However, when Edward IV took the throne during the Wars of the Roses, the Mount was returned to the Syon Abbey in 1462.

John de Vere, 13th Earl of Oxford, seized and held it during a siege of 23 weeks against 6,000 of Edward IV's troops in 1473–1474. Perkin Warbeck, a pretender to the English throne, occupied the Mount in 1497. Sir Humphrey Arundell, Governor of St Michael's Mount, led the Prayer Book Rebellion of 1549. During the reign of Elizabeth I, it was given to Robert Cecil, 1st Earl of Salisbury, by whose son it was sold to Sir Francis Bassett. During the Civil War, Sir Arthur Bassett, brother of Sir Francis, held the Mount against the Parliament until July 1646.

The Mount was sold in 1659 to Colonel John St Aubyn. As of 2024, his descendants, the Lords St Levan, remain seated at St Michael's Mount.

=== 18th century ===
Little is known about the village before the beginning of the 18th century, save that there were a few fishermen's cottages and monastic cottages. After improvements to the harbour in 1727, St Michael's Mount became a flourishing seaport.

The 1755 Lisbon earthquake caused a tsunami to strike the Cornish coast over 1,000 miles (1,600 km) away. The sea rose six feet (2 m) in 10 minutes at St Michael's Mount, ebbed at the same rate, and continued to rise and fall for five hours. The 19th-century French writer Arnold Boscowitz claimed that "great loss of life and property occurred upon the coasts of Cornwall."

=== 19th century ===
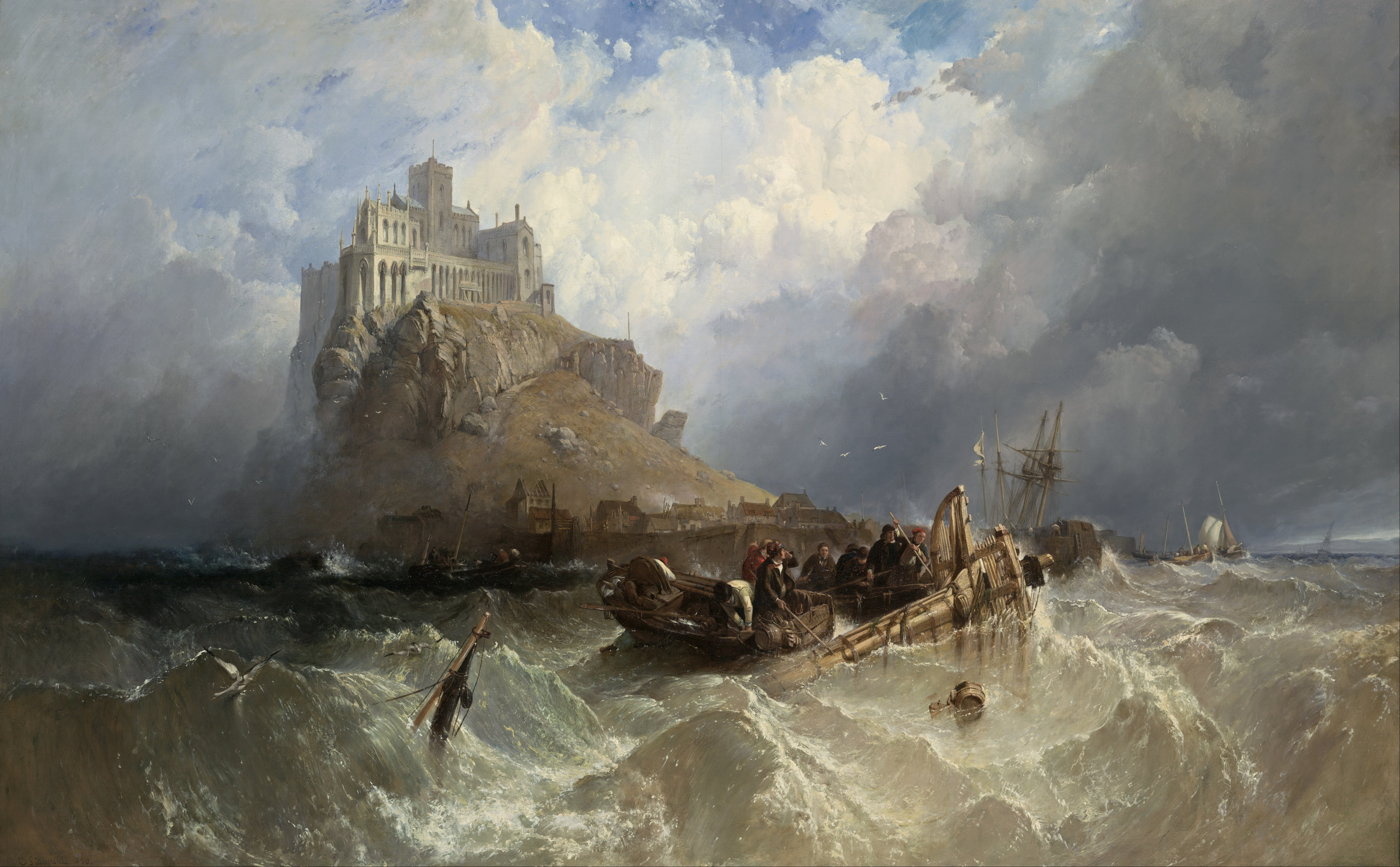
Mount St Michael, Cornwall by Clarkson Stanfield, 1830

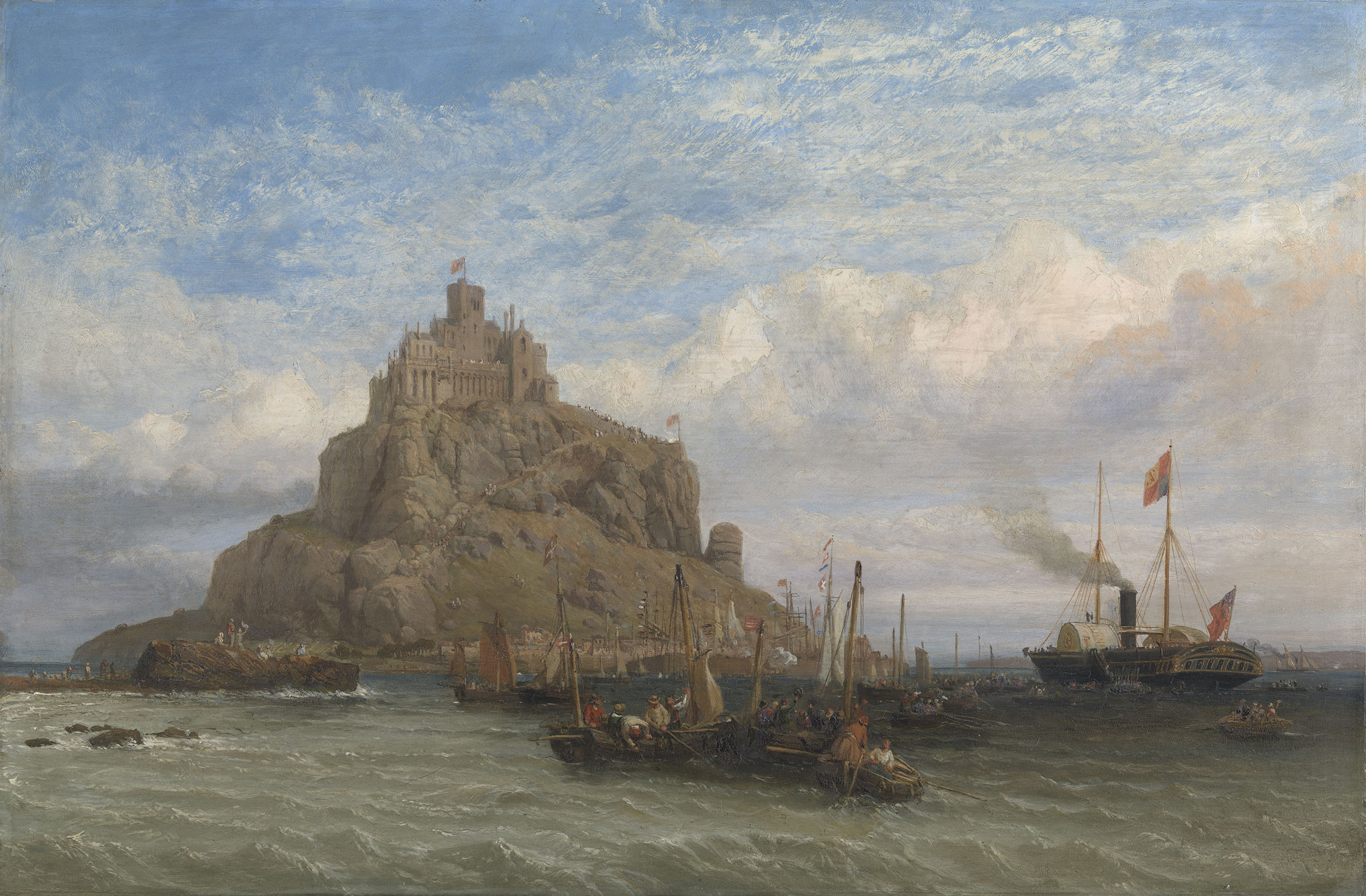
The Royal Yacht Passing St Michael's Mount, by Clarkson Stanfield, 1846

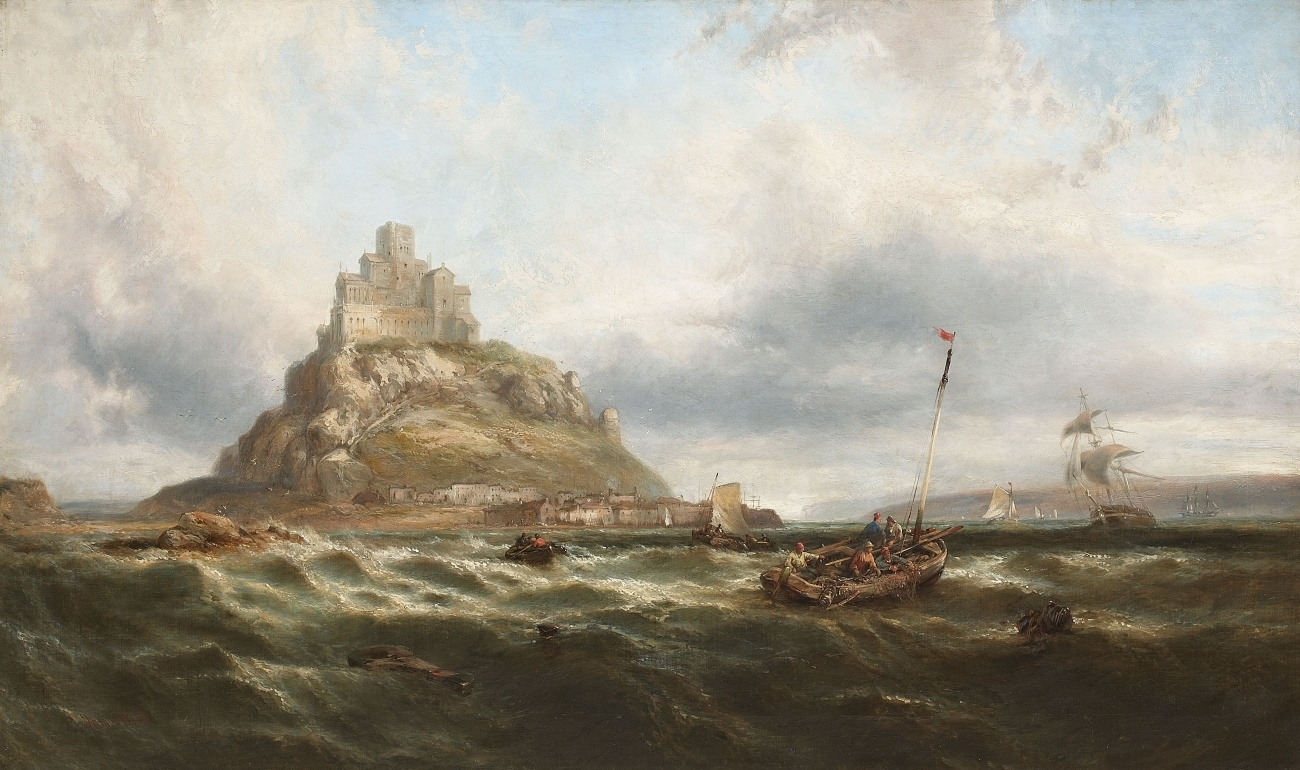
An 1890s painting by James Webb

By 1811, there were 53 houses and four streets. The pier was extended in 1821 and the population peaked in the same year, when the island had 221 people. There were three schools, a Wesleyan chapel, and three public houses, mostly used by visiting sailors. Following major improvements to nearby Penzance harbour, and the extension of the railway to Penzance in 1852, the village went into decline, and many of the houses and other buildings were demolished.

During the 18th and 19th centuries, the structure of the castle was romanticised. In the late 19th century, the remains of an anchorite were discovered in a tomb within the domestic chapel.

A short, underground narrow gauge railway was constructed in about 1900. It was used to bring goods up to the castle and take away rubbish. In 2018, the tramway was reported as being "still in regular use, perhaps not every day", and is not open to the general public, although a small stretch is visible at the harbour; it is Britain's last functionally operational 4 ft 6 in (1,372 mm) railway.

Some sources, including in the British industrial narrow gauge railways, a list of track gauges and, in 2018, on an information board near the line, suggest a different gauge of 2 ft 5 in (737 mm) while The Railway Magazine says it has a gauge of 2 ft 5 1/2 in (750 mm).

=== Second World War ===
The Mount was fortified in World War II, during the invasion crisis of 1940–1941. Three pillboxes can be seen to this day. After the war, the decommissioned battleship HMS Warspite was beached near the mount and was scrapped in situ after attempts to refloat the wreck failed.

Sixty-five years after the Second World War, based on interviews with contemporaries, it was suggested that the former Nazi Foreign Minister and one-time ambassador to London, Joachim von Ribbentrop, had intended to live at the mount after the planned German conquest. Archived documents revealed that during his time in Britain in the 1930s, when he had proposed an alliance with Nazi Germany, von Ribbentrop visited Cornwall frequently.

=== National Trust ===
In 1954, Francis Cecil St Aubyn, 3rd Baron St Levan, gave most of St Michael's Mount to the National Trust, together with a large endowment fund. The St Aubyn family retained a 999-year lease to inhabit the castle and a licence to manage the public viewing of its historic rooms, managed in conjunction with the National Trust.

In 2026, Storm Goretti caused 80% of the trees in St Michael's Mount wood to fall. The National Trust will consider whether to replant tall species like Monterey pine because of the likelihood of more frequent storms due to climate change.

== Priors and owners of St Michael's Mount ==
- 1250 Frà Richard le Scrope
- 1262 Dom Ralph de Vieilles
- 1266 Dom Ralph de Carteret
- 1275 Dom Richard de Perrers, collated by Bishop Walter Branscombe
- 1283 Dom Geoffrey de Gernon
- 1316 Dom Peter de Carewe, Prior during Bishop John Grandisson's visitation
- 1342 Dom Nicholas d'Isabelle
- 1349 Dom John Hardy, until indictment at Launceston 1354
- 1362 Dom John de Voland
- 1385 Dom Richard de Harepath (his official prioral brass seal survives)
- 1412 Dom William Lambert, Prior
- 1537 Richard Arscott, Archpriest
- 1539 Dissolution of Syon Monastery; St Michael's Mount reverted to the Crown
- 1611 Royal grant of St Michael's Mount to Robert Cecil, 1st Earl of Salisbury
- 1640 Fee conveyed to William Cecil, 2nd Earl of Salisbury by Sir Francis Bassett; later sold to the St Aubyn family.

== Preservation ==
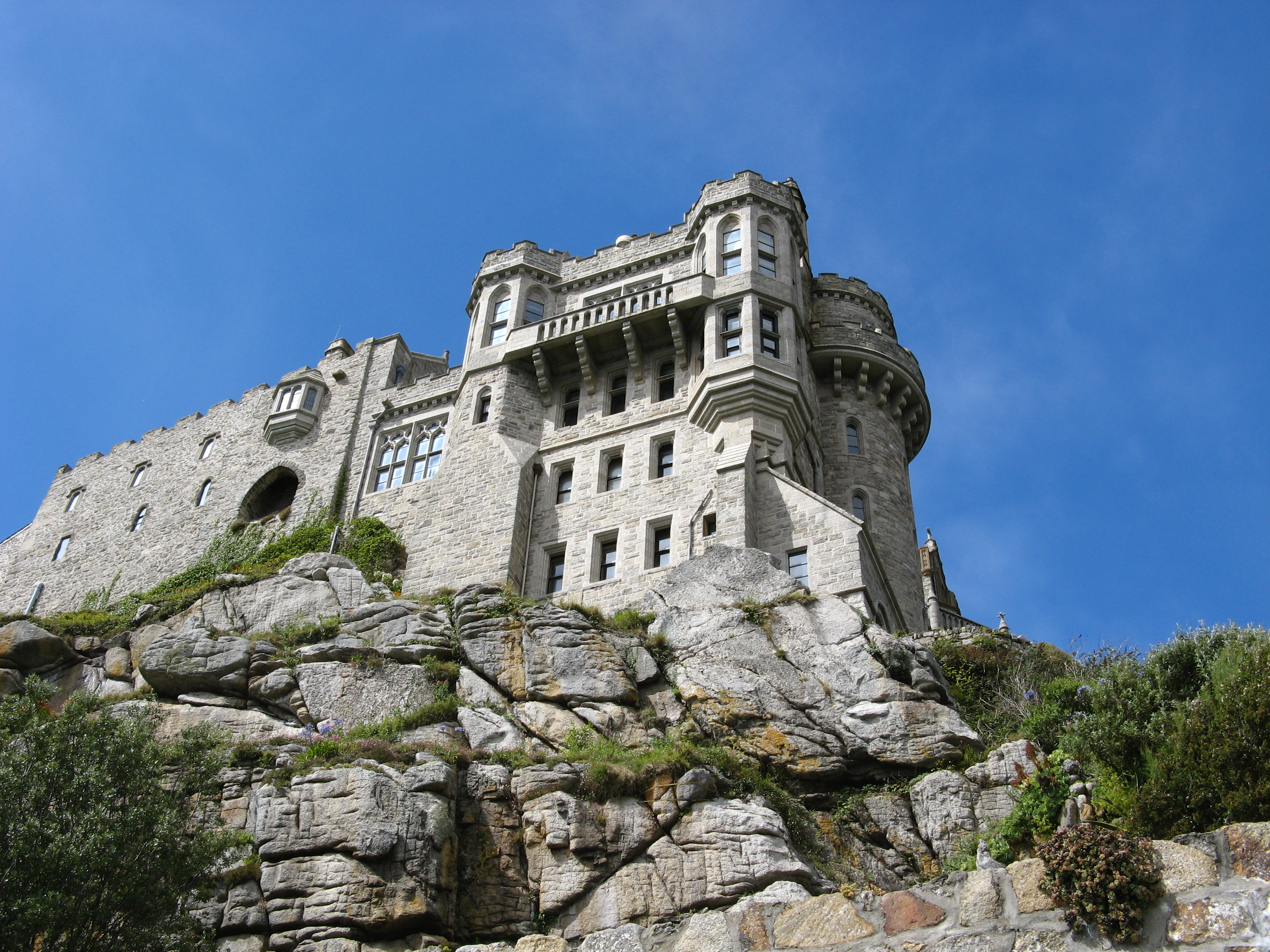
South-east side of the castle, facing offshore

The chapel of St Michael, a 15th-century building, has an embattled tower, one angle of which is a small turret, which served for the guidance of ships. The chapel is extra-diocesan and continues to serve the Order of St John by permission of Lord St Levan. Chapel Rock, on the beach, marks the site of a shrine dedicated to the Virgin Mary, where pilgrims paused to worship before ascending the mount. Many antiquities, comprising plate armour, paintings and furniture, are preserved at the castle. Several houses are built on the hillside facing Marazion, and a spring provides a natural flow of water. There is a row of eight houses at the back of the present village; built in 1885, they are known as Elizabeth Terrace. Some of the houses are occupied by staff working in the castle and elsewhere on the island. The mount's cemetery (currently no public access) contains the graves of former residents of the island and several drowned sailors. There are also buildings that were formerly the steward's house, a changing-room for bathers, the stables, the laundry, a barge house, a sail loft (now a restaurant) and two former inns. A former bowling green adjoins one of the buildings. The population of this parish in 2011 was 35.

The harbour, enlarged in 1823 to accommodate vessels of up to 500 tonnes deadweight, has a pier dating back to the 15th century which has also been renovated. Queen Victoria disembarked from the royal yacht at St Michael's Mount in 1846, and a brass inlay of her footstep can be seen at the top of the landing stage. King Edward VII's footstep is also visible near the bowling green. In 1967 Queen Elizabeth the Queen Mother entered the harbour in a pinnace from the royal yacht Britannia.

The island underground railway is used to transport goods from the harbour to the castle. It was built by miners around 1900, replacing the pack horses which had previously been used. Its steep gradient renders it unsafe for passenger use; thus the National Trust has made it out-of-bounds for public access.

The causeway between the mount and Marazion was improved in 1879 by raising it by one foot (30 cm) with sand and stones from the surrounding area. Repairs were completed in March 2016 following damage from the 2014 winter storms. Some studies indicate that any rise in ocean waters as well as existing natural erosion would put some of the Cornwall coast at risk, including St Michael's Mount.

=== Local government ===
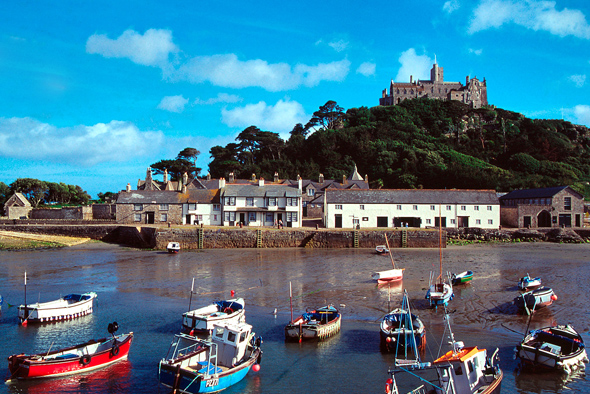
St Michael's Mount (2005)

Until the 1890s, both the mount and the town of Marazion formed part of the parish of St Hilary. St Michael's Mount forms its own civil parish for local government purposes. Currently, this takes the form of a parish meeting as opposed to a parish council (that is, a yearly meeting of electors that does not elect councillors). Lord St Levan currently chairs the St Michael's Mount parish meeting.

== Geology ==
The rock exposures around St Michael's Mount provide an opportunity to see many features of the geology of Cornwall in a single locality. The mount is made of the uppermost part of a granite intrusion into metamorphosed Devonian mudstones or pelites. The granite is itself mineralised with a well-developed sheeted greisen vein system. Due to its geology, the island's seaward side has been designated a Site of Special Scientific Interest since 1995.

=== Granites ===
There are two types of granite visible on the mount. Most of the intrusion is a tourmaline muscovite granite which is variably porphyritic; this is separated from a biotite muscovite granite by pegmatites.

=== Devonian pelites ===
Originally laid down as mudstones these pelites were regionally metamorphosed and deformed (mainly folded here) by the Variscan orogeny. They were then affected by the intrusion of the granite, which caused further contact metamorphism, locally forming a hornfels, and tin mineralisation.

=== Mineralisation ===
The best developed mineralisation is found within the uppermost part of the granite itself in the form of sheeted greisen veins. These steep W-E trending veins are thought to have formed by hydraulic fracturing, when the fluid pressure at the top of the granite reached a critical level. The granite was fractured and the fluids altered the granite by replacing feldspars with quartz and muscovite. The fluids were also rich in boron, tin and tungsten, and tourmaline, wolframite and cassiterite are common in the greisen veins. As the area cooled, the veins became open to fluids from the surrounding country rock and these deposited sulphides, e.g. chalcopyrite and stannite. Greisen veins are also locally developed within the pelites.

== Folklore ==
In prehistoric times, St Michael's Mount may have been a port for the tin trade, and Gavin de Beer made a case for it to be identified with the "tin port" Ictis/Ictin mentioned by Posidonius.

There are popular claims of a tradition that the Archangel Michael appeared before local fishermen on the mount in the 5th century AD. But in fact this is a modern myth. The earliest appearance of it is in a version by John Mirk, copying details of the medieval legend for Mont-Saint-Michel from the Golden Legend. The folk-story was examined and found to be based on a 15th-century misunderstanding by Max Muller.

The chronicler John of Worcester (Note: Noted by de Beer 1960: 162f as "Florence of Worcester" in Thomas Forester's edition, London, England, 1854: 206.) relates under the year 1099, that St Michael's Mount was located 6 miles (10 km) from the sea, enclosed in a thick wood, but that on the third day of November the sea overflowed the land, destroying many towns and drowned many people as well as innumerable oxen and sheep; the Anglo-Saxon Chronicle records under the date 11 November 1099, "The sea-flood sprung up to such a height, and did so much harm, as no man remembered that it ever did before". The Cornish legend of Lyonesse, an ancient kingdom said to have extended from Penwith toward the Isles of Scilly, also talks of land being inundated by the sea.

One of the earliest references to the mount (originally named "Dynsol" or "Dinsul"), was in the mid 11th century when it was "Sanctus Michael beside the sea".

In the 1600s, John Milton used the Mount as the setting for the finale of what was once one of the most famous poems in English literature, his "Lycidas", which drew on the traditional sea-lore that had it that the archangel Michael sat in a great stone chair at the top of the Mount, seeing far over the sea and thus protecting England. In the mid-1850s the poem's scenes of the drowning of Lycidas, in the seas below the Mount, were illustrated in engravings and paintings by J.M.W. Turner. The poem drew together various traditions from the Bible, classical mythology and local folklore to offer an elegy for the pagan world that had faded away.

== Legend ==
According to legend, the island was once home to a giant named Cormoran, who lived on the Mount and stole livestock from local farmers. A reward was offered to stop Cormoran and a boy named Jack put himself forward, killing Cormoran by trapping him in a concealed pit and burying him there. When he returned home, the elders in the village gave him a hero's welcome, and henceforth, called him "Jack the Giant Killer".

== In popular culture ==
The mount has featured in a number of films, including:

- The 1979 film Dracula, where it was featured prominently as the exterior of Carfax Abbey.
- It appeared in the 1983 James Bond film Never Say Never Again, as two air-launched cruise missiles armed with nuclear warheads fly over the English countryside and out to sea, passing directly over St Michael's Mount.
- In the 2003 film Johnny English, it was used as the exterior of the character Pascal Sauvage's French château.

It has also been used in the following:

- In 2006, Simon Armitage published a poem "Causeway" in Tyrannosaurus Rex Versus The Corduroy Kid dealing with a family visit to St Michael's Mount.
- In 2012, it was a filming location for the fantasy adventure film Mariah Mundi and the Midas Box.
- In 2021, it was used for the Game of Thrones prequel series House of the Dragon.
- "Mt Saint Michel + Saint Michaels Mount" is the title of a song on the album drukQs by musician Aphex Twin.
- It was one of the locations used for BBC One's "Balloon" idents which were used from Autumn 1998 to 2002.
- Under its Cornish name of Karrek Loos yn Koos, the island appears prominently in Giles Kristian's 2018 historical fiction novel Lancelot.
- St Michael's Mount is the setting for The Dead of Winter, a murder mystery written by Nicola Upson featuring the detectives Archie Penrose and Upson's fictionalised version of the author Josephine Tey, published in 2021.

== Images ==
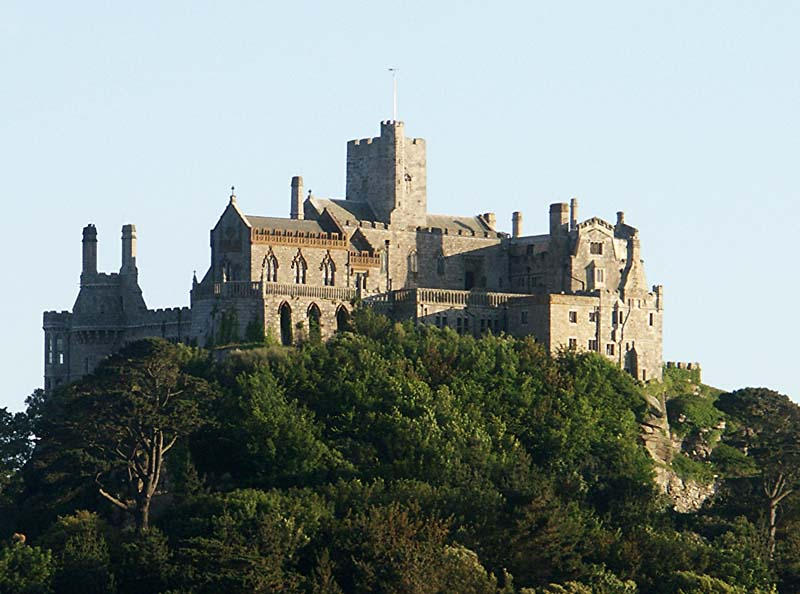
Castle of St Michael

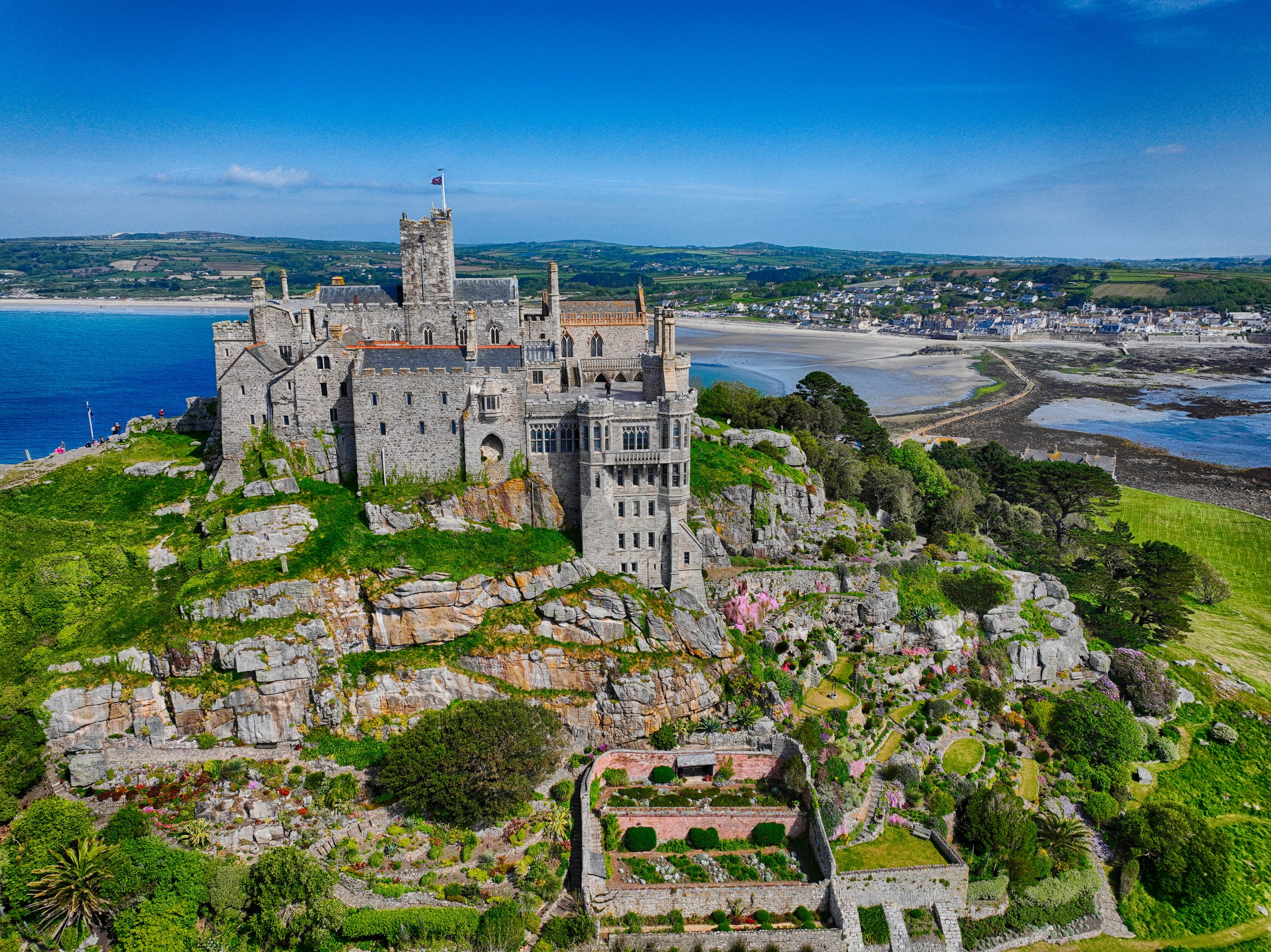
Aerial view

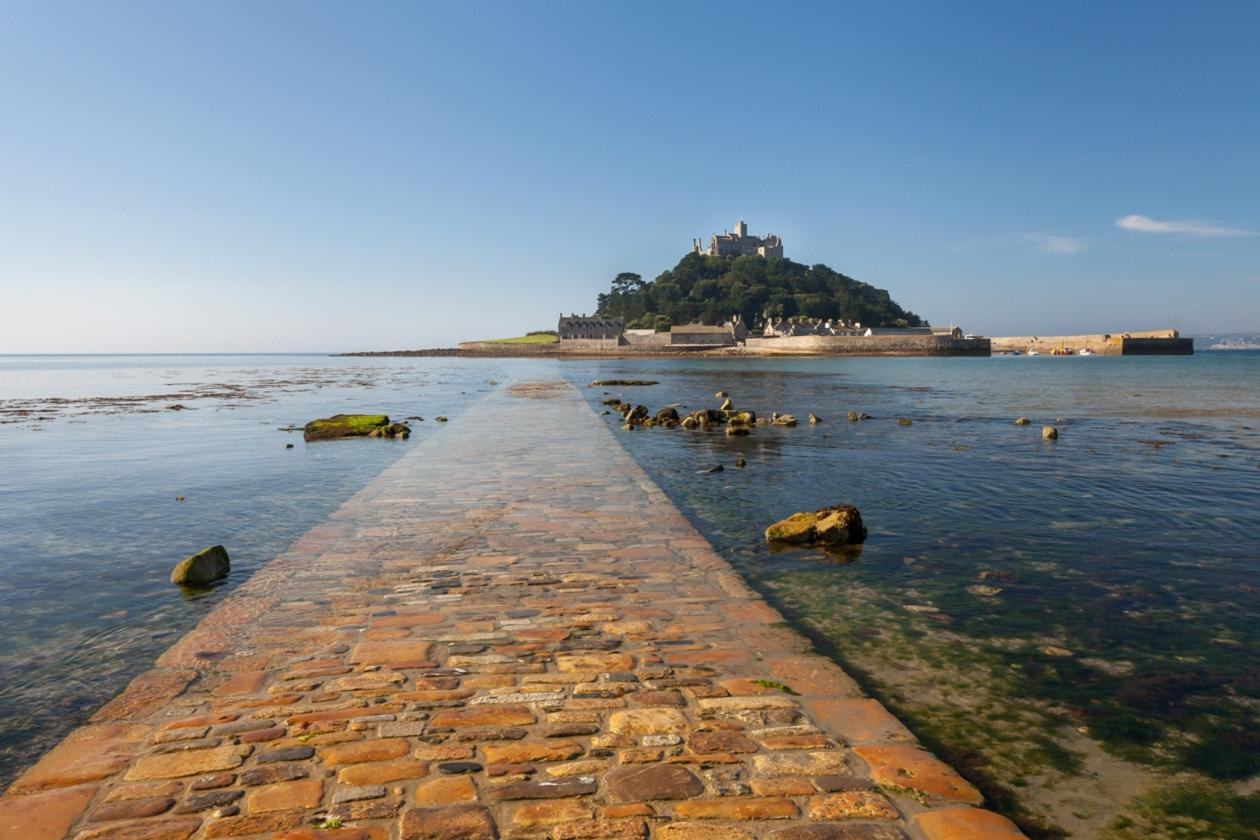
Tidal causeway

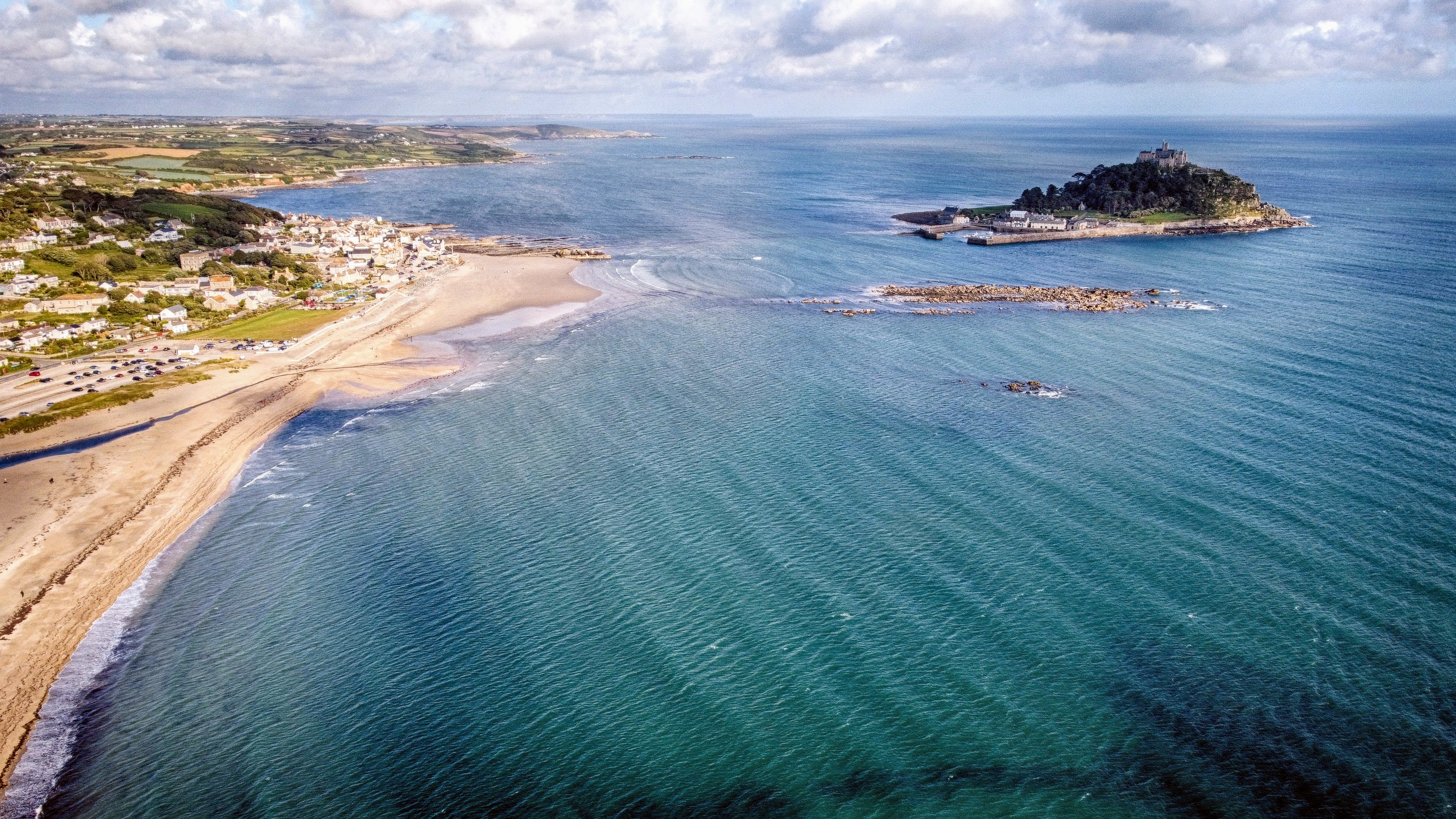
Aerial view including Marazion

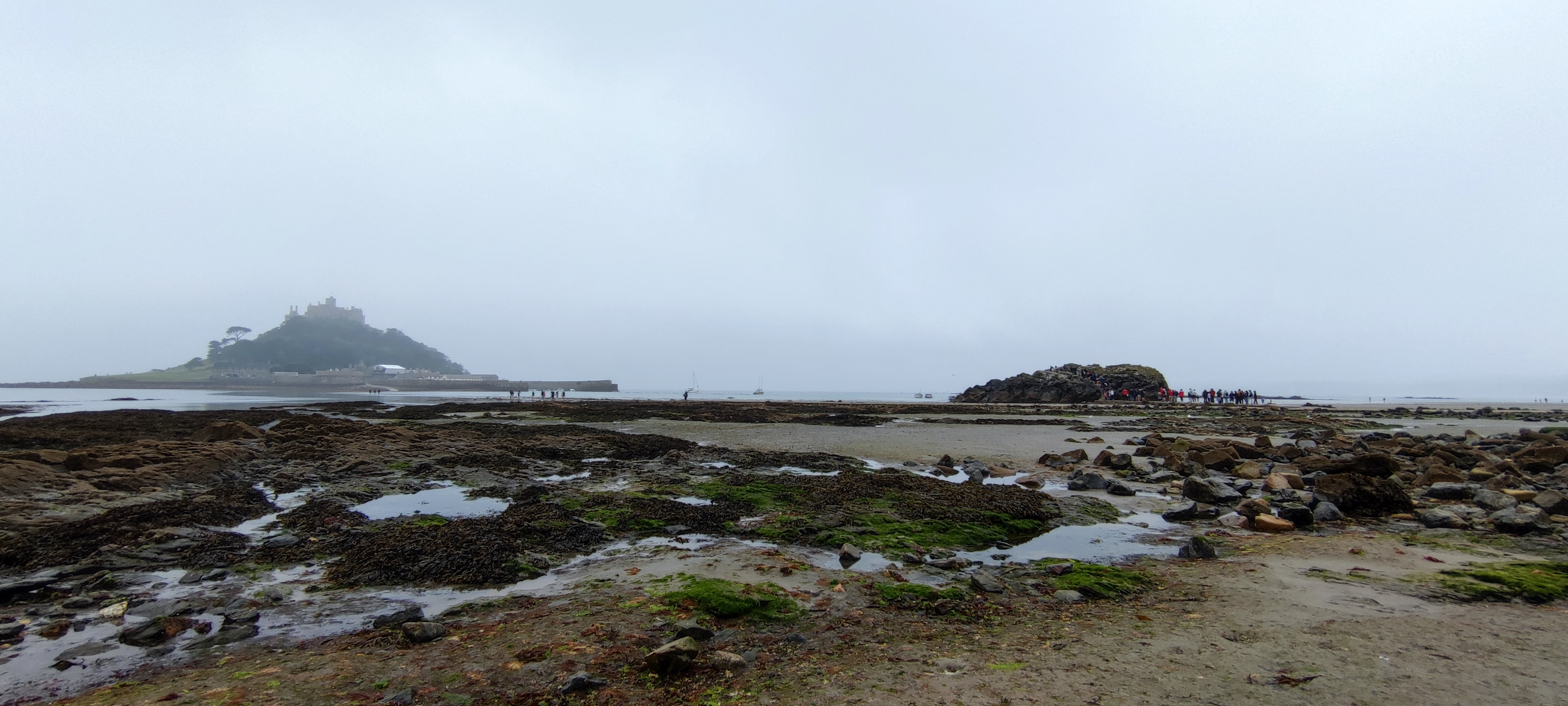
St Michael's Mount in the fog

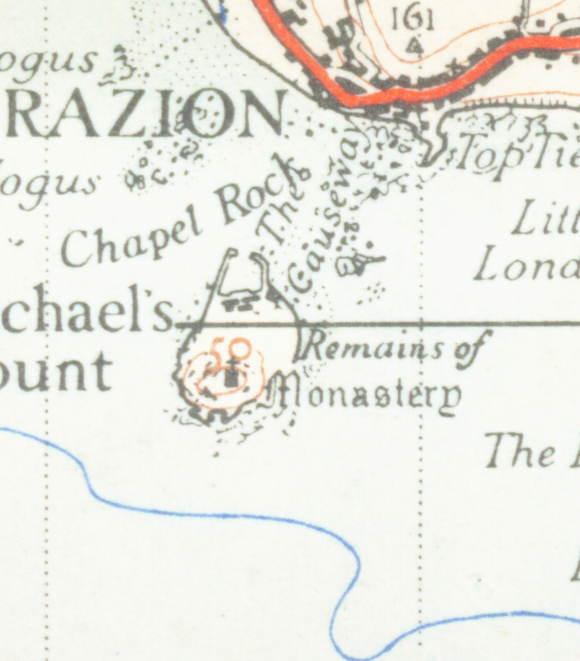
Local map from 1946

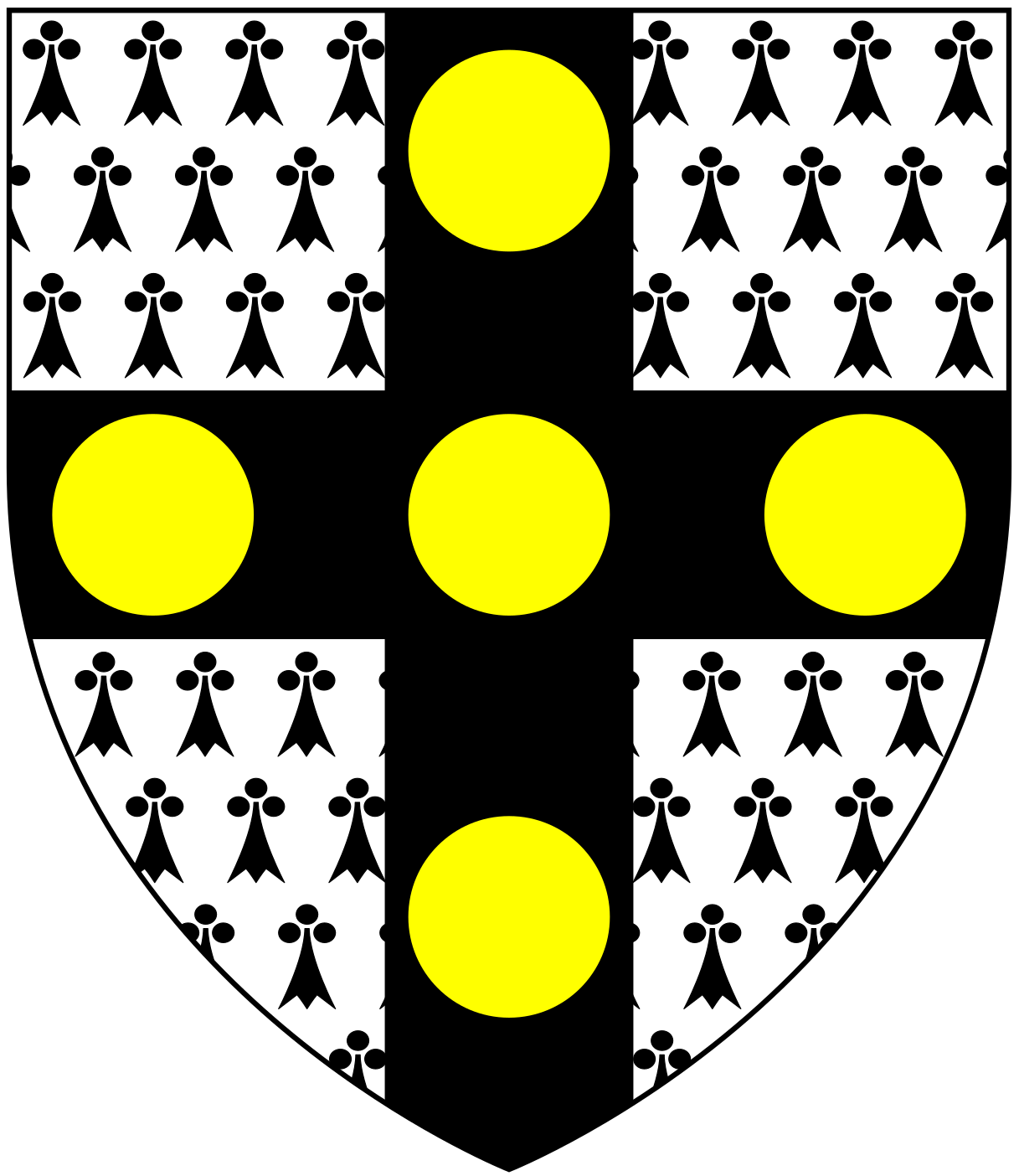
St Aubyn family arms

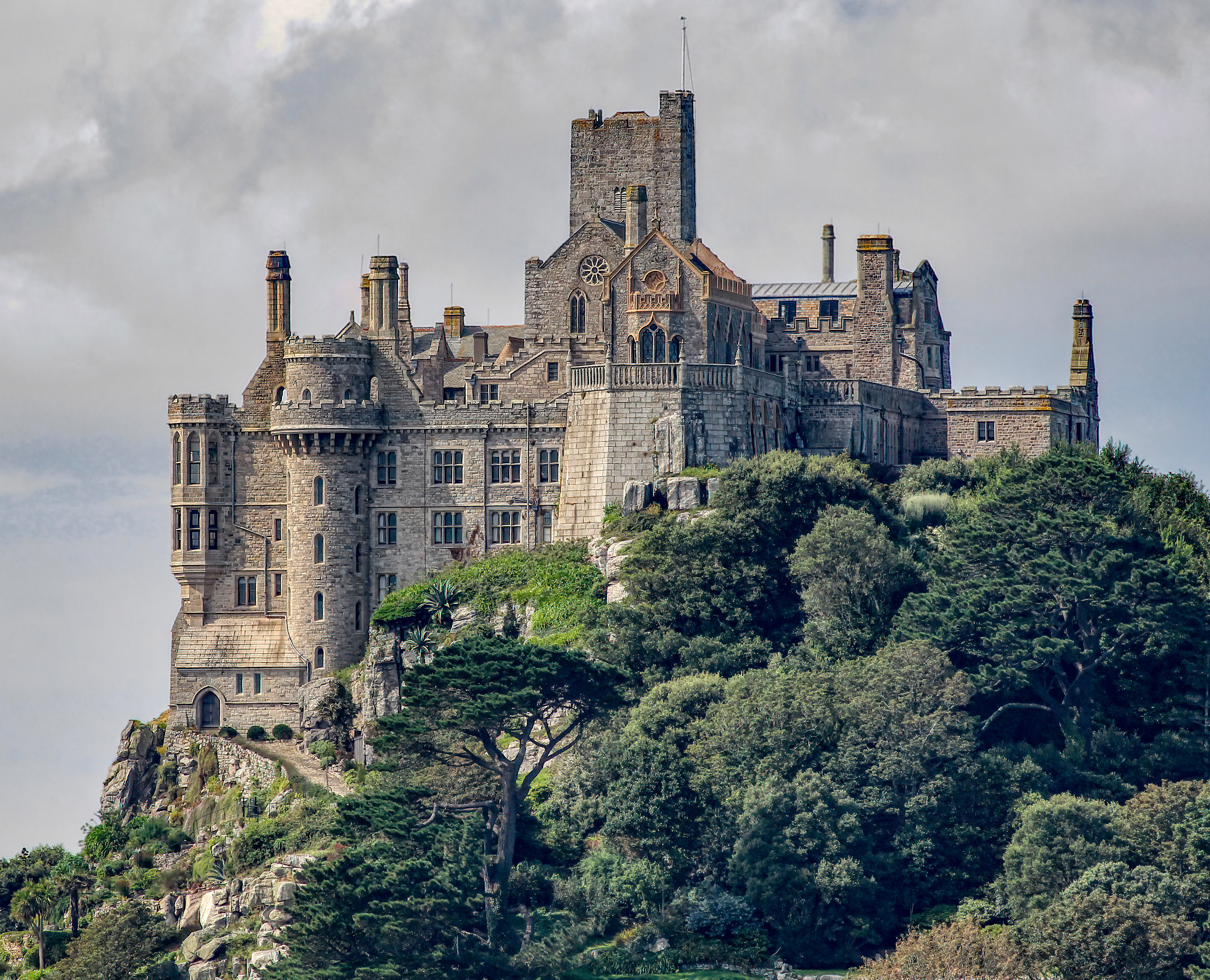
Detailed picture of St Michael's Mount castle

Burgee of Mount's Bay Sailing Club, Marazion, featuring a silhouette of the island.

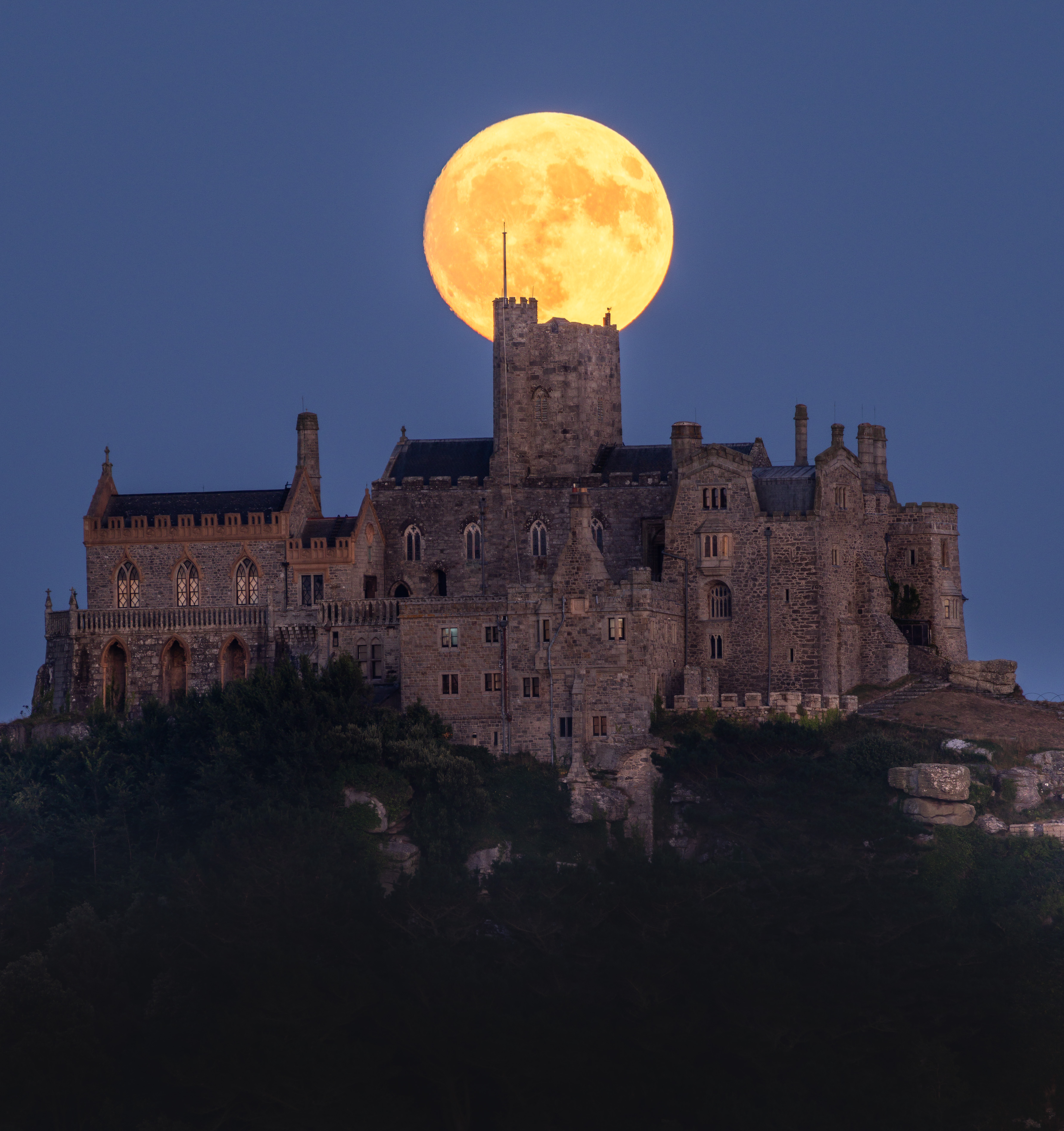
Full moon rising directly above the castle

== See also ==
- Benedictine Order in the United Kingdom
- Cormoran
- English Gothic architecture
- Key Monastery
- La Mère Poulard
- List of monastic houses in Cornwall
- Mont-Saint-Michel, France
- Mont-Saint-Michel Abbey
- Mont Saint Michel and Chartres (1904) by Henry Adams
- Saint-Malo
- Saint Michael in the Catholic Church
- Skellig Michael
- St Aubyn family
- Saint Michael's line
- Tombolo.
