= Tom Hickathrift =

Legendary figure of East Anglian folklore

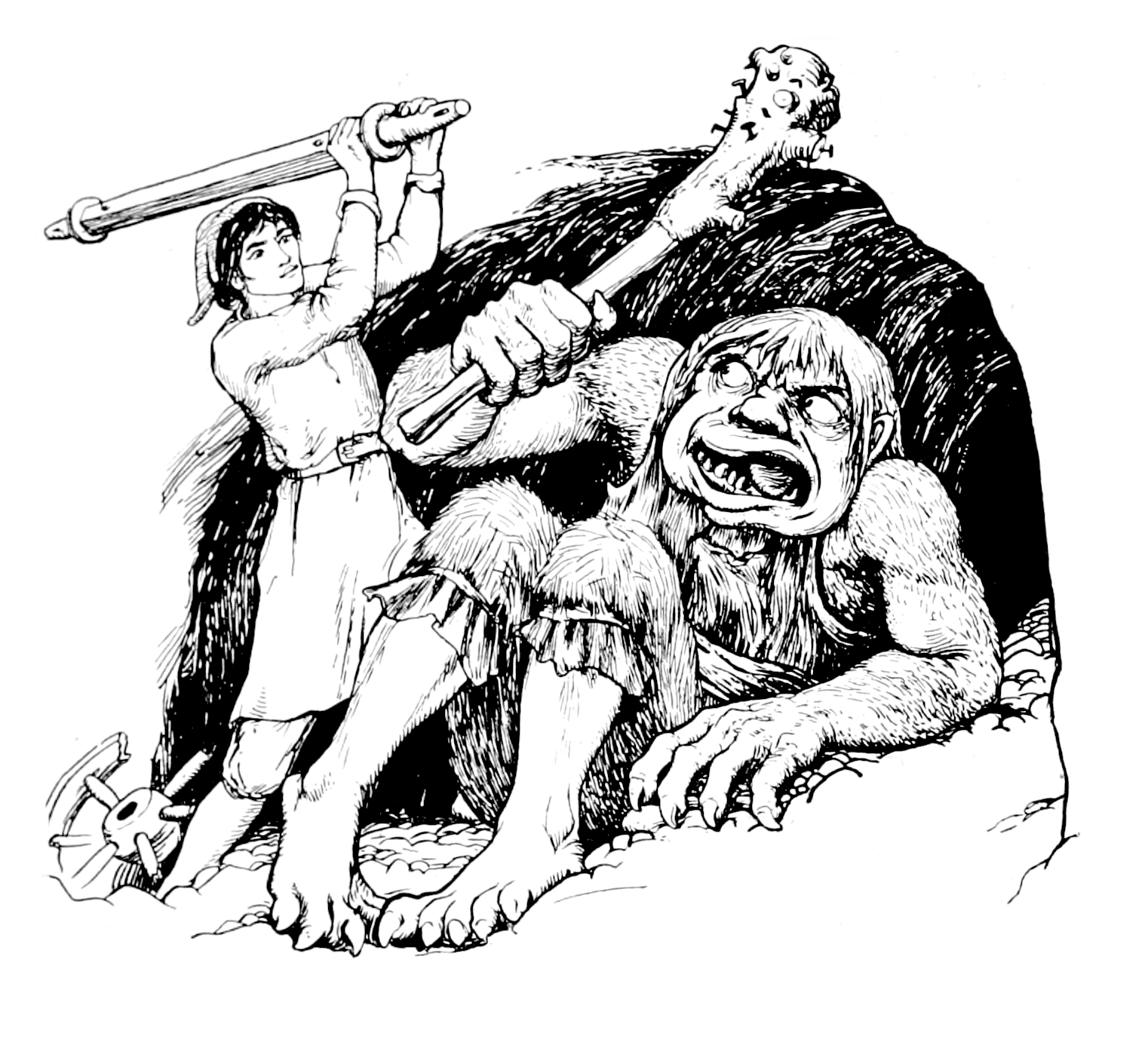
1894 illustration of Tom Hickathrift battling the Wisbech Giant

Tom Hickathrift (or sometimes Jack Hickathrift) is a legendary figure of East Anglian English folklore — a character similar to Jack the Giant Killer. He famously battled a giant, and is sometimes said to be a giant himself, though normally he is just represented as possessing giant-like strength.

== Life and adventures ==
Various stories of his exploits have grown up. In one version he is fabled to have been a simple labourer at the time of the Norman Conquest and to have killed a giant in the marsh at Tilney, Norfolk armed only with an axle-tree stuck into a cartwheel. When his makeshift weapon broke he grabbed a "lusty rawboned miller" and used him as a weapon instead. This exploit earned him the governorship of Thanet. At St Peter's Church in Walpole St Peter there is a depression in the ground, where it is said a cannonball landed after he threw it to scare away the devil (in this version Tom is a giant).

In the fairy tale as told by Joseph Jacobs, Tom lived in one of the marshes of the Isle of Ely and although initially lazy and gluttonous, he was prodigiously tall and it soon became apparent that he had the strength of twenty men. Various proofs of his strength are given: he carried twenty hundredweight of straw and a tree as if they weighed nothing, kicked a football so far that nobody could find it and turned the tables on four men who tried to rob him. He eventually got a job carting beer in Wisbech, but the long journey tired him, so one day he cut across the land of the Wisbech Giant. The giant took this badly and fetched his club to beat Tom, but at this point Tom took the axletree and cartwheel and fought the giant. After a furious battle the giant was killed. Tom took his land and was from then on held in esteem by the people of the area.

Jacobs cites his source as the chapbook, edited by G. L. Gomme, in the Pepys Library from around 1660. Gomme's introduction states that there was evidence that an axle-tree and cartwheel had figured on a stone tomb in Tilney All Saints churchyard and local accounts associated these with a man named Hickifric who had withstood the tyranny of the lord of the manor.

== Origins ==
It has been suggested that he echoes the Norse god Thor (Anglo-Saxon: Þunor): they were both known for fighting giants, ate prodigiously and used a hammer-like weapon (there is even a suggestion that the "miller" and Thor's hammer Mjolnir come from the same source).

== Cultural legacy ==
He is mentioned in Laurence Sterne's Tristram Shandy and Lavengro by George Borrow, although Borrow places his exploits in Lincolnshire.

The elaborate moulded plasterwork (pargeting) decorating the Old Sun Inn in Saffron Walden, Essex features his battle against the Wisbech Giant. There are still references to Hickathrift in the Wisbech area: Hickathrift Farm, Hickathrift House and Hickathrift Corner exist. The large indentation known as Hickathrift's Washbasin has however been built over. A large stone cross remains in Tilney All Saints churchyard, thought to be the last of three that were collectively known as Hickathrift's Candlesticks.

A character named Hiccafrith, based on Tom, appears in Marcus Pitcaithly's Hereward trilogy.

In the Wisbech area naughty children were told "Old Tom Hickathrift'll get you" and an old rhyme was still well known in the 1920s.

He ate a cow and a calf,
An ox and a half,
The church and the steeple,
And then all the people,
And still had not enough.

From time to time the story of Tom is reenacted, as occurred in Wisbech in 2016 as part of a HLF funded project.

The folktale features in the Enid Porter project.

The Hickathrift website contains a children's play, poem and other material drawing on the legend.

== Bibliography ==
- Tibbitts, Charles John (C.J.T.). Folk-lore and Legends: English. Philadelphia: J. B. Lippincott & Co. 1891. pp. 89–116.
