= Charter of Traboe =

Grant of land at Traboe, Trevallack and Grugwith, all in St Keverne, and at Trewethey in St Martin-in-Meneage, Cornwall
- Exeter D.C. 2527
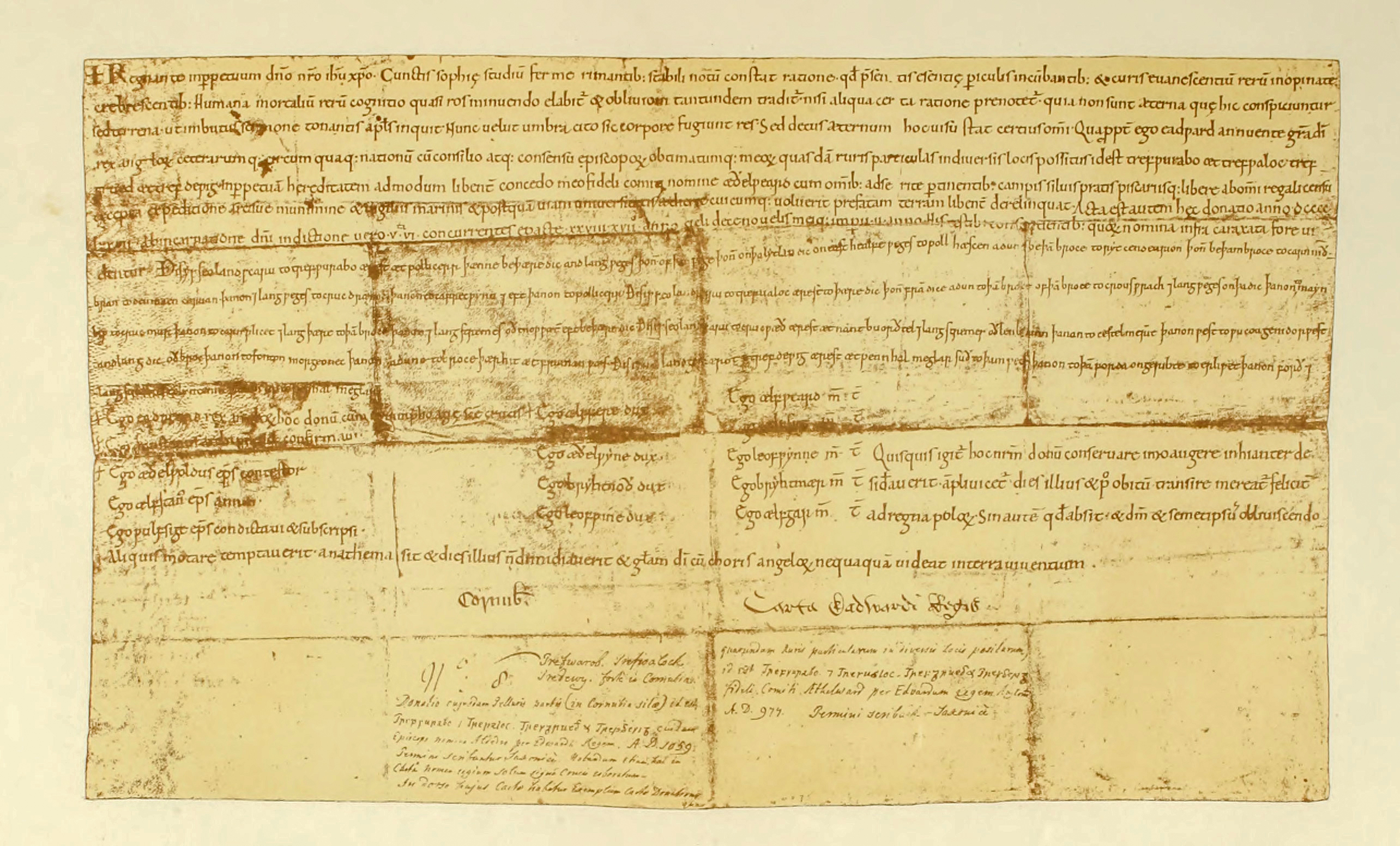
- Charter of King Edward to Æthelweard (Sawyer 832), of land at Traboe, Trevallack and Grugwith, St Keverne, and Trethewey in St Martin-in-Meneage, Cornwall dated AD 977. Sawyer 1027 granting the same lands 72 years later in 1059 is written on the reverse.
- Also known as: Charter of Traboe
- Type: Charter
- Date: 977 & 1059
- Material: vellum
- Other: Sawyer nos. 832 & 1027

The charters granting land at Traboe, Trevallack and Grugwith (St Keverne) and Trethewey in St Martin-in-Meneage, are two Anglo-Saxon charters, endorsed on opposite sides of the same manuscript, dating to 977 and 1059 and kept in the Exeter Cathedral Library. Neither are thought to be original and are "manifestly copies", possibly dating to the "3rd quarter of the 11th century". They are written in Latin with a short boundary clause in old English.

== Concordance ==
Concordance of Authors
Shelfmark	Sawyer	Hooke	Finberg
Exeter D.C., 2527, verso	832	6	F90
Exeter D.C., 2527, recto	1027	10	F99

Photozincograph facsimiles of the charters were published by the Ordnance Survey in 1878.

== Content ==
The two charters are copies of each other and grant three named estates in St Keverne parish (Traboe, Trevallack, Grugwith) and one in St Martin in Meneage (Trethewey). The first (Sawyer 832), dating to 977 A.D. was granted by Edward the Martyr to Ealdorman Æthelweard during his short reign of only 3 years. This is written on the back of a nearly identical charter of 1059 A.D. (Sawyer 1027) where Edward the Confessor grants the same lands to Bishop Ealdred of Cornwall. Neither charter is considered to be original and they are dated, based on their paleography, to the third quarter of the 11th century. Davidson suggests that the original charters may have been produced at the monastic institutions of Bodmin or St Germans. Bishop Ealdred died in 1069 and the lands are not mentioned by name in Domesday (1086), implying they had by then passed to the monastic community of St Keverne. They were eventually granted to St Michael's Mount.

=== Boundary clause ===
Hooke translates the boundary clause as:

==== Traboe ====
This is the land boundary of Traboe: First at Polkerth then beside the dyke along (the) way, then from the way to the little dyke on the east side of the way, to the pool of the hassock-grass or sedge, down beside the brook to the Durra ford, then beside the brook to crow’s nest tor, to two stones coruan; 'thence along the way to (the) barrow [of the] thorns (Cornish cruc. dreyn), thence to (the) white rock, and back thence to Polkerth.

==== Trevallack ====
This is the land boundary of Trevallack: First to the dyke, then from (the) dyke down to the brook, from the brook to Crousa, along (the) way to the dyke, thence to (the) cattle stone, to (the) great barrow, thence to carnwlicet (? tor), along here to the brook, thence along the stream as far as (the) ƿæst valley, again beside the dyke.

==== Grugwith ====
This is the estate boundary of Grugwith: First at (the) valley with the cattlefold along (the) stream as far as lenbroinn (pool of rushes), thence to Kestlemerris, thence west to ƿucou (? for crucou) genidor, west along the dyke as far as (the) brook, thence to spring of the anis, thence down to (the) brook where it first began.

==== Trethewey ====
This is the estate boundary of Trethewey: First at the head of the marsh (? with a saint’s name) southwards to the way, thence to the ford straight on to erliƿet, thence onwards along (the) stream to (the) pool of wild garlic, thence up to the head of ? marsh.

== Text ==
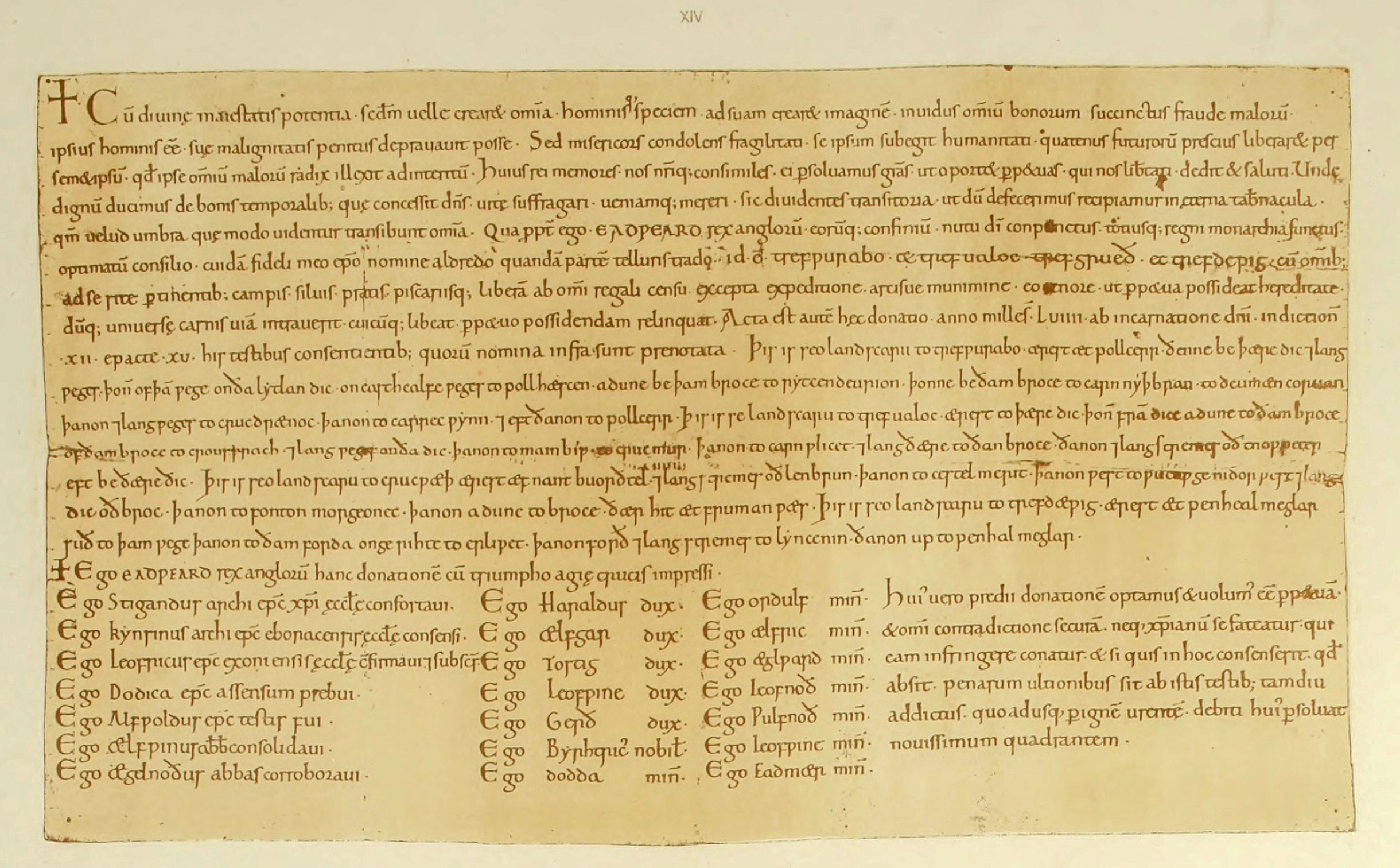
The charter of Edward the Confessor to Bishop Ealdred of Cornwall (A.D. 1059) granting identical lands (Sawyer 1027).

The English translation of the Latin text of Sawyer 832 (A.D. 977) after Whitelock (1955), which Davidson suggests has been updated from the later charter of 1059 (Sawyer 1027), making it slightly more accurate. The boundary clause has been left in Old English:

Our Lord Jesus Christ reigning for ever. It is known by firm reason to almost all who pursue the study of wisdom, that, as the dangers of the present existence are threatening and the cares of evanescent things unexpectedly increasing, human knowledge of mortal affairs, vanishing like dew, fades away, and is at length given to oblivion, unless it is noted down before by some secure means, because the things which are seen here are not eternal but temporal, as the Apostle, inspired with speech of the Thunderer, says. Now, like a shadow, the corporeal things quickly flee; but the eternal glory stands more certain than all that is visible. On this account, I, Edward, by the gift of the grace of God, king of the English and of the other nations on every side, with the counsel and consent of my bishops and chief men, willingly concede to my faithful ealdorman Æthelweard by name certain portions of land situated in diverse places, namely Treraboe, Trevallack, Grugwith and Trethewey, in perpetual inheritance with all things duly belonging to them, fields, woods, meadows and fisheries, free from all royal dues except military service and the fortification of fortresses and maritime guard; and after he goes the way of all flesh, he is to leave at will the aforesaid land to whoever he shall wish. And this donation was done in the year 977 from the incarnation of our Lord, the fifth indiction, 66 concurrents, 28 epacts, in the seventeenth year of the cycle of nineteen years, in the second year of my reign; these witnesses consenting whose names are seen to be inscribed below.

Ðis ys seo landscaru to trefƿurabo ærist æt pollicerr ƿænne be þære dic and lang ƿeges þon of þa ƿege þon on þa lytlan dic on east healfe ƿeges to poll hæscen adun be þa broce to ryt cendeurjon þon be þam broce to carnuið bran to-deumaen coruan. þan on ⁊ lang ƿeges to cruc dænoc þanon to carrecƿynn ⁊ eft þanon to pollicerr. Ðis is seo landscaru to trefualoc ærest to þære dic þon fra dice adun to þa broce of þa broce to crousƿrach ⁊ lang ƿeges on þa dic þanon to mayn biƿ to cruc mur þanon to carn plicet ⁊ lang þære to þa broc þanon ⁊ lang stremes oð tnoƿ ƿret eft be þære dic. Ðis is seo landscaru to cruc ƿæð ærest æt nantbuorðtel ⁊ lang stremes oð lenbroinn þanan to cestelmerit þanon ƿest to ƿucou genidor ƿest andlang dic oð broc þanon to fonton morgeonec þanon adune to broce þær hit æt fruman ƿes. Ðis is seo landgemrero to trefdeƿig ærest ret pennhal meglar suð to þam ƿeg þanon to þa forda ongerihte to erliƿet þanon forð ⁊ lang stremes to lyncenin þanon up to penhal meglar.

I, Edward, king of the English [confirm] this gift with the triumphal sign of the Holy Cross. I, Dunstan, archbishop, have confirmed. I, Æthelwold, bishop, testify. I, Ælfstan, bishop, have assented. I, Wulfsige, bishop, have agreed and subscribed. I, Ælfhere, ealdorman. I, Æthelwine, ealdorman. I, Brihtnoth, ealdorman. I, Leofwine, ealdorman. I, Ælfweard, king’s thegn, testify. I, Ælfsige, king’s thegn, testify. I, Leofwine, king’s thegn, testify. I, Brihtmær, king’s thegn, testify. I, Ælfgar, king’s thegn, testify. Whoever, therefore, shall eagerly desire to preserve, nay rather to increase, this our gift, may his life be prolonged and may he deserve to go after his death happily to the kingdom of the heavens. But if, which God forbid, anyone forgetting God and himself shall try to alter it, may he be anathema, and may he not live out half his days, and may he by no means see the glory of God with the choirs of angels in the land of the living.

== Bibliography ==
- Chaplais, Pierre (1966). "The Authenticity of the Royal Anglo-Saxon Diplomas of Exeter". Historical Research. 39 (99): 16. doi:10.1111/j.1468-2281.1966.tb00662.x.

== See also ==
- Charter of Tywarnhayle
- Charter of Lesneague and Penarth
- Charter of St Buryan
- Diplomatics
- List of Anglo-Saxon Charters
