= Charter of Lesneague and Pennarth =

Anglo Saxon Charter

King Edgar to Wulfnoth Rumuncant; Charter of Lesneage and Pennarth, Cornwall
- Exeter, D.C., 2521
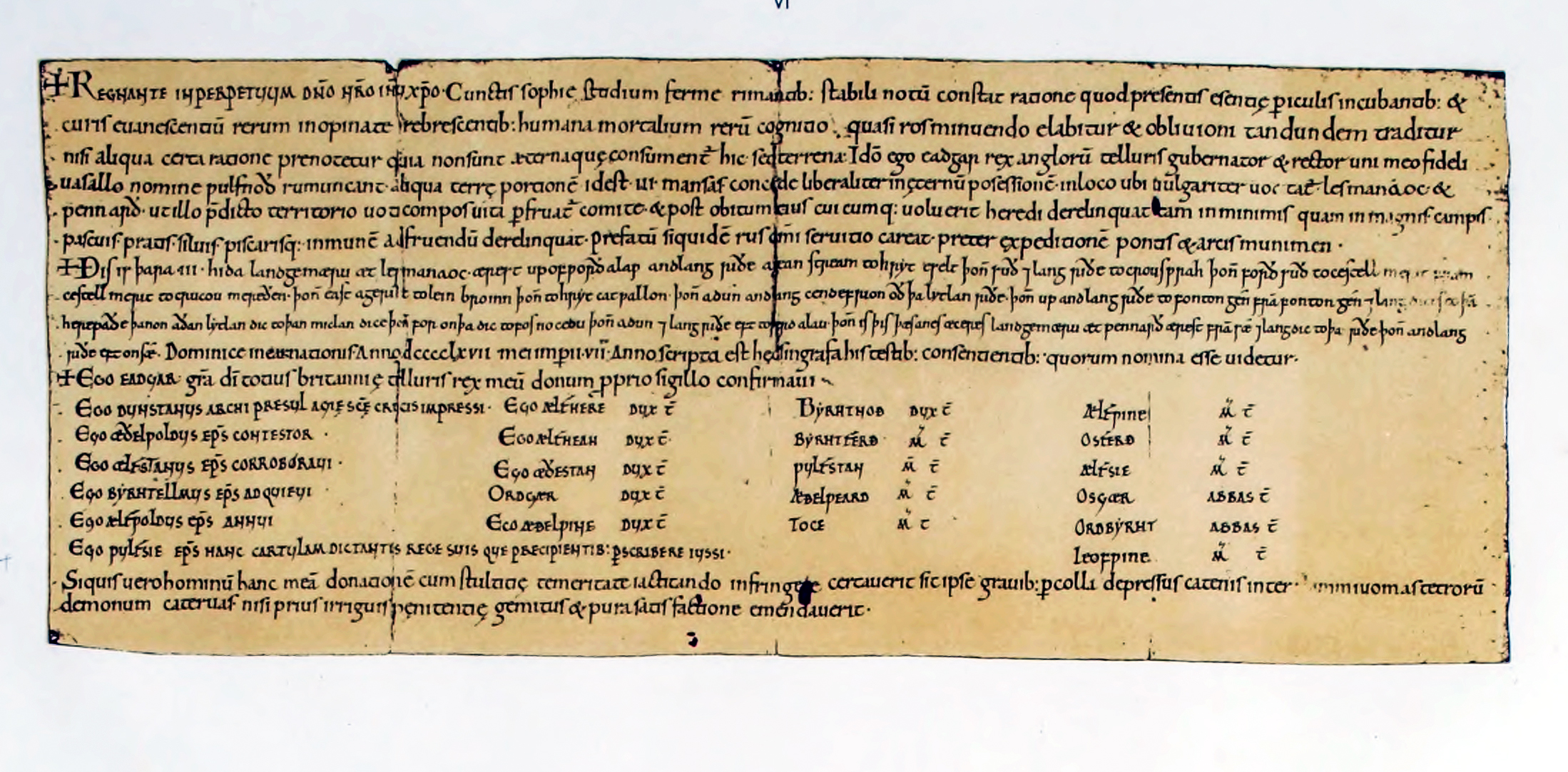
- A.D. 967. King Edgar to Wulfnoth Rumuncant, his faithful vassalus; grant of 3 hides (mansae) at Lesneage and Pennare in St Keverne, Cornwall. Latin with English bounds
- Type: Anglo-Saxon Charter
- Date: 967 AD
- Language(s): Latin, Old English
- Author: Wulfsige
- Material: Parchment
- Other: Sawyer no: S 755

The charter of King Edgar to Wulfnoth Rumuncant, granting land at Lesneague and Pennarth in St Keverne, Cornwall, is an Anglo-Saxon charter dating to 967 AD and kept in the Exeter Cathedral Library. It was written by Wulfsige bishop of Cornwall mainly in Latin with a short boundary clause in old English.

The charter is said to be an 11th century copy of the 10th century original, dating to Bishop Leofric's scriptorium at Exeter.

== Concordence ==
Concordence of Authors
Shelfmark	Sawyer	Hooke	Finberg
Exeter D.C., 2521	S755	4a	F84

== Content ==
The charter covers a grant of some share of land ("aliqua terre portionem") in 3 mansae at Lesneague and Pennarth in St Keverne, Cornwall. It was granted by King Edgar to Wulfnoth Rumuncant, his "faithful vassalus"; a unique binomen in the Prosopography of Anglo Saxon England database.

The interests granted were "in fields, pastures, meadows, woods" and the charter is witnessed by 16 people, including archbishop Dunstan, 5 other bishops (episcopae), 6 ealdormen (duces), 8 thegns (ministerae) and 2 abbots. The land at Lesneague covered the modern villages of St Keverne and Porthallow, and a portion of Goonhilly Downs. Together with Traboe, Lesneague was given to the Benedictine monks of St Michael's Mount by Robert Count of Mortain. The 10th century Lesneague was substantially larger in size that the present day farm of that name.

=== Boundary clause ===
Hooke (1994, pp. 37-) translates the boundary clause as:

==== Lesneage ====
First up from Porthallow along (the) stream against the stream (i.e. upstream) to Eselt's (or Isolt's) ford; then south along (the) stream to Crousa; then onwards south to Kestlemerris; from Kestlemerris to (the) mereden barrows; then east straight to lein broinn; then to Catwallon’s ford; then down along (the) cendefrion as far as the little streamlet; then up along the streamlet to (the) cold spring; from (the) cold spring along (the) dyke to the highway; thence down (the) little dyke to the great dyke; then following the dyke to fos no cedu; then down along (the) streamlet back to Porthallow

==== Pennare ====
First from the sea along (the) dyke to the stream; then along (the) stream back to the sea.

== Text ==
The translated text after Sanders (1878). The boundary clause has been left in old English:

✠ Our Lord Jesus Christ reigning forever! It appears evident to all who pursue the study of wisdom that amidst the dangers of brooding over our present being and the unexpected and increasing cares of evanescent matters, human acquaintance with worldly affairs fading away, vanishes like dew and is forgotten unless it be by some sure means noted down in time, because it is not eternal thingsthat are bestowed here but earthly things. Therefore I Eadgar King, governor and ruler of the land of the Angles free grant in eternal possession to my faithful vassal by name ƿulfnoð rumuncant a certain portion of land that is three mansae in the place where it is commonly called lesmanaoc and pennarð, that he may enjoy it at his will during his life and after his death may leave to whatever heir he may wish, to be freely enjoyed as well in very little as in great things, fields, pastures, meadows, woods and fisheries. For indeed let his aforesaid land be free of all service save army service and defence of bridge and castle.

✠ Ðis is þara . iii . hida landgemmru æt lesmanaoc . ærest up of ƿorðalaƿ audlang riðe agean stream to hryt eselt þoñ suð ⁊ lang riðe to crousprah þoñ forð suð to cestell merit fram cestell merit to crucou mereðen . þoñ east ageriht to lein broinn þoñ to hryt catpallon. þoñ adun andlang cendefrion oð þa lytlan riðe. þoñ up andlang riðe to fonton gén frā fonton gén ⁊ lang dices to þā herepaðe þanon aðan lytlan dic to þan miclan dice . þoñ for on þa dic to fosno cedu þoñ adun ⁊ lang riðe eft to ƿerdalau. þoñ is þis þæs anes æceres landgemæru æt pennarð ærest frā sæ ⁊ lang dic to þa riðe . þoñ andlang riðe eft on sæ.

In the year of the Dominical Incarnation 967 the 7th of my reign this deed was written, these witnesses consenting whose names appear to be:

✠ I Eadgar by the grace of God King of all the land of Britain confirm my gift with my own sign. I Dunstan archbishop have impressed the sign of the holy cross. I æðelƿold bishop call to witness. I ælfstan bishop corroborated. I byrhtellmus bishop acquiesced. I ælfƿoldus bishop assent. I ƿulfsie bishop by the order of the King and at the command of his council have ordered this charter to be written in full. I ælfhere ealdorman 𝕿. I ælfheah ealdorman 𝕿. I æðestan ealdorman 𝕿. Ordgær ealdorman 𝕿. I æðelpine ealdorman 𝕿. Byrhtnoð ealdorman 𝕿. Byrhterð thegn 𝕿. ƿulfstan thegn 𝕿. Æðelpeard thegn 𝕿. Toce thegn 𝕿 .Ælfƿine thegn 𝕿. Osferð thegn 𝕿. Ælfsie thegn 𝕿. Osgær abbot 𝕿. Ordbyrht abbot 𝕿. Leofƿine thegn 𝕿.

If, however, any man with the rashness of folly shall boastingly strive to infringe this my grant, let him be pressed down with heavy chains about his neck amid the flame-vomiting rout of squalid demons, unless with the refreshing groans of penitence he previously make amends and meet satisfaction.

== Bibliography ==
- Chaplais, Pierre (1966). "The Authenticity of the Royal Anglo-Saxon Diplomas of Exeter". Historical Research. 39 (99): 13–14. doi:10.1111/j.1468-2281.1966.tb00662.x.
- Davidson, James B. (1883). "On Some Anglo-Saxon Charters at Exeter". Journal of the British Archaeological Association. 39 (3): 269–272. doi:10.1080/00681288.1883.11887848. hdl:2027/hvd.32044081133175.
- Hooke, Della (1994). Pre-conquest Charter-bounds of Devon and Cornwall. Boydell & Brewer.
- Insley, Charles (2020). "Languages of Boundaries and Boundaries of Language in Cornish Charters". The Languages of Early Medieval Charters: Latin, Germanic Vernaculars, and the Written Word. Brill. pp. 342–377. ISBN 978-90-04-43233-8.
- Sanders, William Basevi (1872). Facsimiles of Anglo-Saxon manuscripts. Vol. 2. Southampton: Ordnance Survey Office.
- Whitelock, Dorothy (1955). English Historical Documents: 500-1042. Vol. 1. Eyre & Spottiswoode.

== See also ==
- Charter of Tywarnhayle
- Charter of St Buryan
- History of Cornwall
- Anglo Saxon Charters
- Prosopography of Anglo Saxon England
- Charter of Traboe
- List of Anglo-Saxon Charters
