= Charter of St Buryan =

943 charter attributed to King Athelstan

King Athelstan to the church of St Buryan
- Devon Record Offices E/R 4 fol.25
- Also known as: Charter of St Buryan
- Date: 6 October 943 AD
- Place of origin: Kingston-on-Thames, Surrey
- Language: Latin
- Other: Sawyer no.450

The charter to the Church of St Buryan, granting land in 7 places in St Buryan parish, is an Anglo-Saxon charter that is said to date to 943 AD and is attributed to King Athelstan. However, it only survives as a later copy in the 14th century episcopal register of John Grandisson. In Grandission's register it is found as a copy of a confirmation of the original charter by William Briwere in 1238. It is written in Latin with a boundary clause mentioning pre-conquest Cornish place names. It is the oldest charter relating to Cornwall to contain a boundary clause.

== Concordance ==
Concordance of Authors
Manuscript	Sawyer	Kemble	Birch	Hooke	Finberg
DRO E/R 4 fol.25	450	1143	785	1	78

== Date ==
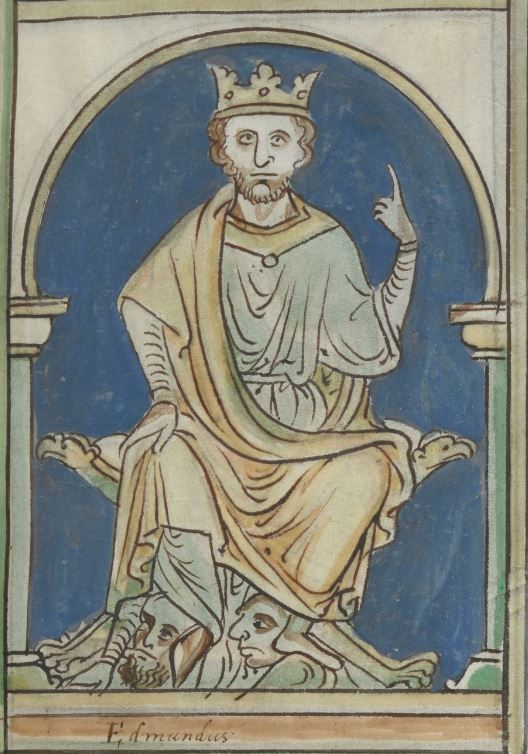
King Edmund I of England from a 12th-century illuminated manuscript. He is thought to be the true author of the charter as Athelstan had died in AD 939.

Athelstan died in AD 939 so the attribution of the charter to him, if the date is correct, cannot be true. Olsen describes it as a corrupt copy of a genuine document. Bishop Briwere rededicated the St Buryan church during a visit on August 26, 1238, also confirming its privileged sanctuary. He is said to have seen the original charter, perhaps written in Insular Script, in the church and ordered it copied word for word into the church's books, so that "the aforementioned privilege and deed of sanctuary and liberty, drawn up of old, might not be able to perish from age". It was again copied into Bishop Grandisson's register as evidence in his case that St Buryan was not a royal peculiar.

The text of the charter states that it was made in the year of the Incarnation 943, corresponding to the 19th Cycle, 7th Indication, 2nd Concurrence, 7th Epact or Athelstan's 12th regnal year. Oliver Padel states that Athelstan had already received semi-legendary status within the Exeter Diocese by the 13th century and that, given this, it is more likely that Athelstan's name had been inserted into a genuine charter dated 943, than that the date 943 had been inserted into a charter genuinely granted by Athelstan. If the date is correct, then the true attribution should be Edmund; Athelstan's younger half-brother and successor.

== Content ==
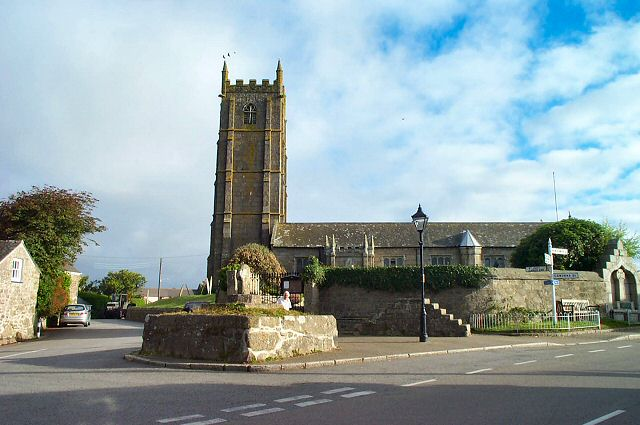
St Buryan Church.

The original charter was written in Latin, however a portion was translated into English by Charles Henderson.The charter begins with a "lengthy and verbose invocation" typical of Anglo-Saxon charters of the period and then follows the main body.

=== Dispositive Section ===
I Ethelstan King of the Angles and of the other races in circuita at the petition of my nobles have given a certain piece (particula) of land in the place called the Church of St. Beriana that is a manor divided into 7 places - in honour of God and the Blessed Beriana - for the redemption of my soul and for the length of my days in the eternal inheritance. I have given it with all its appurtenances, fields meadows pastures rivers and fisheries on this condition that the land shall be free from all secular burden except the burden of prayer which the clerks have promised for me - viz. 100 masses 100 psalteries and daily prayers. Should any man presume to violate this donation, let his name be struck out of the book of the living. This Donation was made in the year of the Incarnation 943 the 19th Cycle 7th Indication 2nd Concurrence 7th Epact and the 12th of my reign, the 6th Lunar Cycle in the nones of October at the town called Kyngeston.

=== Boundary Clause ===
The boundary clause first begins by describing the boundary of the estate belonging to the Church of St Buryan that would later become its parish, and then the vill of Burnewhall. English translation after Della Hooke:

These boundaries surround the aforesaid estate, that is: from the spring as far as the dyke, from the dyke which stretches around kescel cromlech as far as yolbrunnemian, and thence as far as fimbol, and thence as far as (the) priests’ bridge, and thence as far as (the) stone ?marsh, and thence to peluagerens, and thence as far as mankependouri, ascending uphill as far as polmaduc, and thence around the dyke to kacregan, and thence by right of the road as far as (the) stream, climbing against the stream (i.e. upstream) as far as the spring, afterwards three arpennae to the vill which is called Bodonewel (Burnewhall). The boundaries of this little vill also begin from benberd (Penberth) ascending against (the) stream as far as (the) ?mills (melynou), and thence as far as (the) "hole stone" in Lentrisidyn, ascending by right of the road uphill through the middle of bossegham, and thence by right of the dyke as far as fonghad, descending between two dykes as far as the stream, and thence descending as far as the sea.

=== Lands ===
The charter then mentions seven lands granted to the church and their areas, totaling one "hide" (mansa), each individually measured in "arpennas". These were: Pendre (Pendrea; 1), Bokankeed (Bosanketh; 3), Botilwoelon (defunct farmstead; 2), Treikyn (name lost; 2), Bosselynyn (Bosliven; 1), and Trevernen (Treverven; 1), all in Cornwall.

=== Witnesses ===
The charter is then consented, affirmed, subscribed and witnessed by 21 people, including Athelstan himself as agent, 3 archbishops, 5 dukes, 2 discifers, and 8 ministers. Identifications are taken from the Prosopography of Anglo-Saxon England database.

I Æthelstan king of all Britain have confirmed this charter with the sign of the holy cross . + I Wulfhelm archbishop have consented and subscribed . + I Æthelfel archbishop have affirmed and subscribed . + I Radulph archbishop have signed and subscribed . + I Conan bishop have signed . + I Æthelstan duke witness . + I Ælfstan duke witness . + I Beordolf duke witness . + I Hulfrit duke witness . + I Helfrit duke witness . + I Oddo discifer witness . + I Wulfheh in Trimfine witness . + I Helpine discifer witness . + I Ælfnoth minister witness . + I Wulfar minister witness . + I Ælfnoth minister witness . + I Ælfrid minister witness . + I Beornth minister witness . + I Ædulfus minister witness . + I Geordaf Æelmarch witness

Wulfhelm is the only of the 3 archbishops mentioned that is known from other Anglo-Saxon charters; Æthelfel is not mentioned in any other documents and Radulph is only known as a bishop (not archbishop) from Athelstan's charter to Milton Abbey dated 934 (S391).

=== Curse ===
The final part of the charter contains a warning to any who might attempt to invalidate its rights and privileges.

== Bibliography ==
- Crofts, C.B. (1955). A short history of St. Buryan. Camborne: West Cornwall Field Club.

== See also ==
- Diplomatics
- Charter of Traboe
- Charter of Lesneague
- Charter of Tywarnhayle
- List of Anglo-Saxon Charters
