= Clergy of the Church of England database =

Online database for 1540–1835 history

The Clergy of the Church of England database (CCEd) is an online database of clergy of the Church of England between 1540 and 1835.

The database project began in 1999 with funding from the Arts and Humanities Research Council, and is ongoing as a collaboration between King's College London, the University of Kent and Durham University. As of September 2014, the database contained nearly 1.5 million evidential records about the careers of Church of England clergy, and the public version of the database had information on over 155,000 individuals.

== Notable people ==
The CCEd has had three joint-directors since 1999:

- Professor Arthur Burns, King's College London
- Professor Kenneth Fincham, University of Kent
- Professor Stephen Taylor, Durham University

The technical research was supervised by Harold Short, Director of the Centre for Computing in the Humanities at King's College London.

== See also ==
- Clerical Guide or Ecclesiastical Directory
