= Wulfsige (bishop of Cornwall) =

10th-century Bishop of Cornwall, England

- Bishop of Cornwall
- Appointed: between 959 and 963
- Term ended: between 981 and 993
- Predecessor: Comoere
- Successor: Ealdred of Cornwall

Orders
- Consecration: between 959 and 963

Personal details
- Died: between 981 and 993
- Denomination: Christian

Wulfsige was a medieval Bishop of Cornwall.

Wulfsige was consecrated between 959 and 963. He died between 981 and 993.

== Citations ==
Christian titles
Preceded by Comoere	Bishop of Cornwall; 959x963–981x993	Succeeded by Ealdred of Cornwall
