= Stephen Baxter (historian) =

British historian (1969–2026)

- Born: September 1969
- Died: January 2026 (aged 56)
- Occupations: Historian and academic
- Title: Professor of Medieval History

Academic background
- Education: Wadham College, Oxford; Christ Church, Oxford
- Thesis: The Leofwinesons: power, property and patronage in the early English kingdom (2002)
- Doctoral advisor: Patrick Wormald

Academic work
- Discipline: History
- Sub-discipline: Early medieval history; History of Anglo-Saxon England; Norman Conquest; Domesday Book
- Institutions: Magdalen College, Oxford; King's College London; St Peter's College, Oxford

Stephen David Baxter (September 1969 – January 2026) was a British medieval historian. He was Barron Fellow and Tutor in Medieval History at St Peter's College, Oxford, from 2014. In 2020 he was awarded the title of Professor of Medieval History by the University of Oxford. He specialised in lordship in late Anglo-Saxon and early Norman England, and the Domesday Book.

== Early life and education ==
Born in September 1969, Baxter completed his undergraduate degree in modern history at Wadham College, Oxford, graduating in 1991 with a double first. He later recalled that being taught by Henry Mayr-Harting inspired him to turn towards medieval history; Baxter would go on to serve as the medieval history tutor at Mayr-Harting's college, St Peter's.

After graduating, Baxter began working in the City of London. He spent three years as a research analyst with PA Consulting Group before joining Schroders in 1995 as an executive in their European corporate finance division. While there, he advised on the privatisation of the Hungarian electricity industry after the collapse of the communist regime there. He returned to Oxford in 1997 to complete a doctorate at Christ Church. His DPhil degree was awarded in 2002 for his thesis, "The Leofwinesons: power, property and patronage in the early English kingdom", which was supervised by Patrick Wormald.

== Academic career ==
Between 2001 and 2004, Baxter was a junior research fellow at Magdalen College, Oxford. From 2004 to 2014, he taught medieval history at King's College, London, firstly as a lecturer and from 2009 as a reader in medieval history. In 2014, he was elected Barron Fellow and Tutor in Medieval History at St Peter's College, Oxford, and Clarendon Associate Professor of Medieval History in the University of Oxford's department of history. In 2020, he was awarded the title of Professor of Medieval History by the University of Oxford. Baxter was vice-master of St Peter's College from 2021 to 2024, and fellow archivist from 2015 until his death.

Baxter was a co-director for the second phase of the AHRC-funded Prosopography of Anglo-Saxon England (PASE) project, alongside Dame Janet Nelson, Simon Keynes, Harold Short and John Bradley; this part of the database, which traced all English persons appearing in documentary sources from 1042 to c. 1100, was published online in 2009. Baxter was also a co-investigator of the AHRC-funded Exon Domesday research project (alongside Julia Crick and Peter A. Stokes); this took place from 2015 to 2018 and resulted in the publication of a new online text of the book and much other research into its content and compilation. In 2025, he published Making Domesday, with Julia Crick and Chris Lewis, which summarised their findings.

== Death ==
Baxter died in January 2026 at the age of 56.

== Bibliography ==
- Baxter, Stephen (2001). "The Representation of Lordship and Land Tenure in Domesday Book". In Hallam, Elizabeth M.; Bates, David (eds.). Domesday Book. Stroud: Tempus Publishing. pp. 73–102.
- Baxter, Stephen (2001). "The Earls of Mercia and their Commended Men in the Mid-Eleventh Century". Anglo-Norman Studies. 23: 23–46.
- Baxter, Stephen (2004). "Archbishop Wulfstan and the Administration of God's Property". In Townend, Matthew (ed.). Archbishop Wulfstan: Papers from Novocentenary Conference. Abingdon: Brepols. pp. 161–205.
- Baxter, Stephen, ed. (2006). The Times of Bede: Studies in Early English Christian Society and Its Historian. Oxford: Blackwell's.
- Baxter, Stephen; Blair, John (2006). "Land Tenure and Royal Patronage in the Early English Kingdom: A Model and a Case Study". Anglo-Norman Studies. 28: 19–46.
- Baxter, Stephen (2007). The Earls of Mercia: Lordship and Power in Late Anglo-Saxon England. Oxford Historical Monographs. Oxford: Oxford University Press. ISBN 9780199230983.
- Baxter, Stephen (2007). "MS C of the Anglo-Saxon Chronicle and the Politics of Mid-Eleventh-Century England". The English Historical Review. 122 (499): 1189–1227. doi:10.1093/ehr/cem322.
- Baxter, Stephen (2008). "The Death of Burgheard Son of Ælfgar and Its Context". In Fouracre, P.; Ganz, D. (eds.). Frankland: The Franks and the World of the Early Middle Ages: Essays in honour of Dame Jinty Nelson. Manchester: Manchester University Press. pp. 266–284.
- Baxter, Stephen (2008). "Domesday Bourn". In Baxter, David (ed.). Medieval Bourn: A Cambridgeshire Village in the Later Middle Ages. Cambridge: Cambridge Digital Press. pp. 35–45.
- Baxter, Stephen (2009). "Edward the Confessor and the Succession Question". In Mortimer, Richard (ed.). Edward the Confessor: The Man and the Legend. Woodbridge: Boydell and Brewer. pp. 77–118.
- Baxter, Stephen; Karkov, Catherine E.; Nelson, Janet L.; Pelteret, David, eds. (2009). Early Medieval Studies in Memory of Patrick Wormald. Studies in Early Medieval Britain. Farnham: Ashgate.
- Baxter, Stephen (2009). "Lordship and Justice in Late Anglo-Saxon England: The Judicial Functions of Soke and Commendation Revisited". In Baxter, Stephen; Karkov, Catherine E.; Nelson, Janet L.; Pelteret, David (eds.). Early Medieval Studies in Memory of Patrick Wormald. Studies in Early Medieval Britain. Farnham: Ashgate. pp. 383–420. ISBN 9780754663317.
- Baxter, Stephen (2011). "Lordship and Labour". In Crick, Julia; van Houts, Elisabeth (eds.). A Social History of England, 900–1200. Cambridge: Cambridge University Press. pp. 98–114.
- Baxter, Stephen (2011). "The Making of Domesday Book and the Languages of Lordship in Conquered England". In Tyler, Elizabeth M. (ed.). Conceptualizing Multilingualism in England, c.800–c.1250. Studies in the Early Middle Ages. Vol. 27. Turnhout: Brepols. pp. 271–308. doi:10.1484/M.SEM-EB.4.8014. ISBN 978-2-503-52856-4.
- Baxter, Stephen (2017). "The Domesday Controversy: A Review and a New Interpretation". The Haskins Society Journal. 29: 225–293. doi:10.1017/9781787443181.009. ISBN 9781787443181. S2CID 211671830.
- Baxter, Stephen (2018). "1066 and Government". In Bates, David (ed.). 1066 in Perspective. Leeds: Royal Armouries Museum. pp. 133–155.
- Baxter, Stephen (2018). "Some Effects of the Norman Conquest". In Dawson, Ian (ed.). Exploring and Teaching Medieval History in Schools. London: The Historical Association. pp. 132–137.
- Baxter, Stephen; Lewis, C. P. (2019). "Domesday Book and the Transformation of English Landed Society, 1066–86". Anglo-Saxon England. 46: 343–403. doi:10.1017/S026367511800011X. S2CID 166935185.
- Baxter, Stephen (2020). "How and Why Was Domesday Made?". The English Historical Review. 135 (576): 1085–1131. doi:10.1093/ehr/ceaa310.
