= Daniel of Cornwall =

10th-century Bishop of Cornwall

Daniel
- Bishop of Cornwall
- Appointed: between 953 and 955
- Term ended: between 959 and 962
- Predecessor: Conan of Cornwall
- Successor: Comoere

Orders
- Consecration: between 953 and 955

Personal details
- Died: between 959 and 962
- Denomination: Christian

Daniel was a medieval Bishop of Cornwall.

Daniel was consecrated between 953 and 955. These dates are established by a letter from Dunstan to King Æthelred II, which states that he was appointed by King Eadred and implies that it was after the death of Bishop Æthelgar of Crediton in 953. He died on 8 October between 959 and 962. He witnessed a manumission of King Eadwig at Exeter.

William of Malmesbury said that Daniel was a monk at Glastonbury Abbey before he became a bishop, which would mean that he was a pupil of Dunstan. His attestation of Abingdon charter S 597 in 956 states that he drafted the charter (hanc singrapham dictavi), but it is disputed whether such claims are usually formulaic or genuine. He witnessed charters of Kings Eadwig and Edgar,

== Sources ==
- Hart, Cyril (1975). The Early Charters of Northern England and the North Midlands. Leicester: Leicester University Press. ISBN 978-0-7185-1131-9.
- Kelly, Susan, ed. (2001). Charters of Abingdon Abbey Part 2. Anglo-Saxon Charters. Oxford, UK: Oxford University Press for the British Academy. ISBN 978-0-19-726221-4.
- Daniel 3 at Prosopography of Anglo-Saxon England

Christian titles
Preceded by Conan of Cornwall	Bishop of Cornwall between 953 and 955–between 959 and 962	Succeeded by Comoere
