= Charter of Tywarnhayle =

Anglo-Saxon charter

King Edgar to Eanwulf; grant of land at Tywarnhayle and Bosowsa, Cornwall
- Exeter Cathedral Library 2522
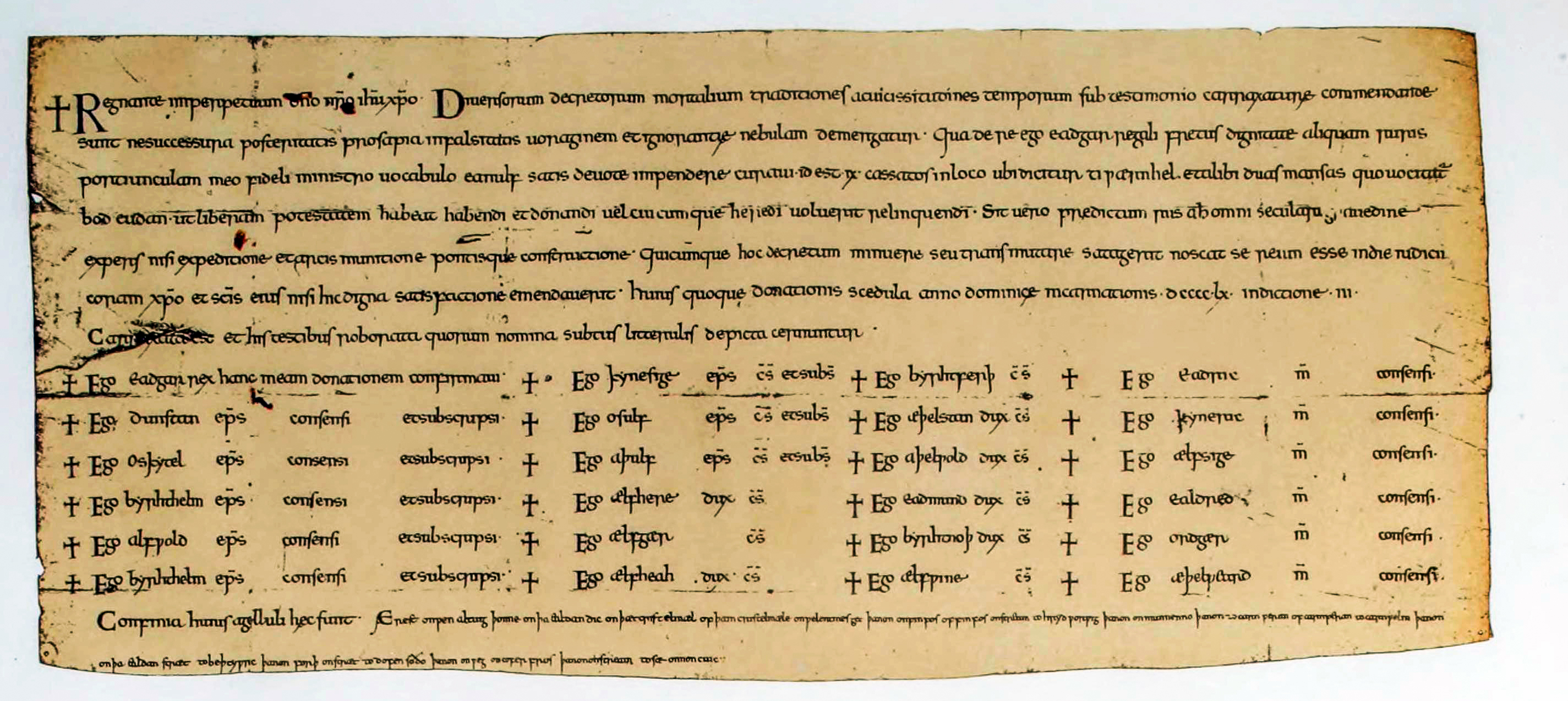
- A.D. 960. King Edgar to Eanulf, his faithful minister; grant of 9 hides (cassati) at Tywarnhayle in Perranzabuloe and St Agnes, and 2 (mansae) at Bosowsa in Ladock, Cornwall. Latin with English bounds
- Type: Anglo-Saxon Charter
- Date: 960 AD
- Place of origin: Crediton Scriptorum
- Material: Parchment
- Other: Sawyer no: S 684

The charter of King Edgar to Eanwulf, granting land at Tywarnhayle and Bowsowsa in Cornwall, is an Anglo-Saxon charter dating to 960 A.D. It was produced in the scriptorium at Crediton and now resides in the Exeter Cathedral Library. It is mainly written in Latin with a short boundary clause written in old English at the end.

== Content ==
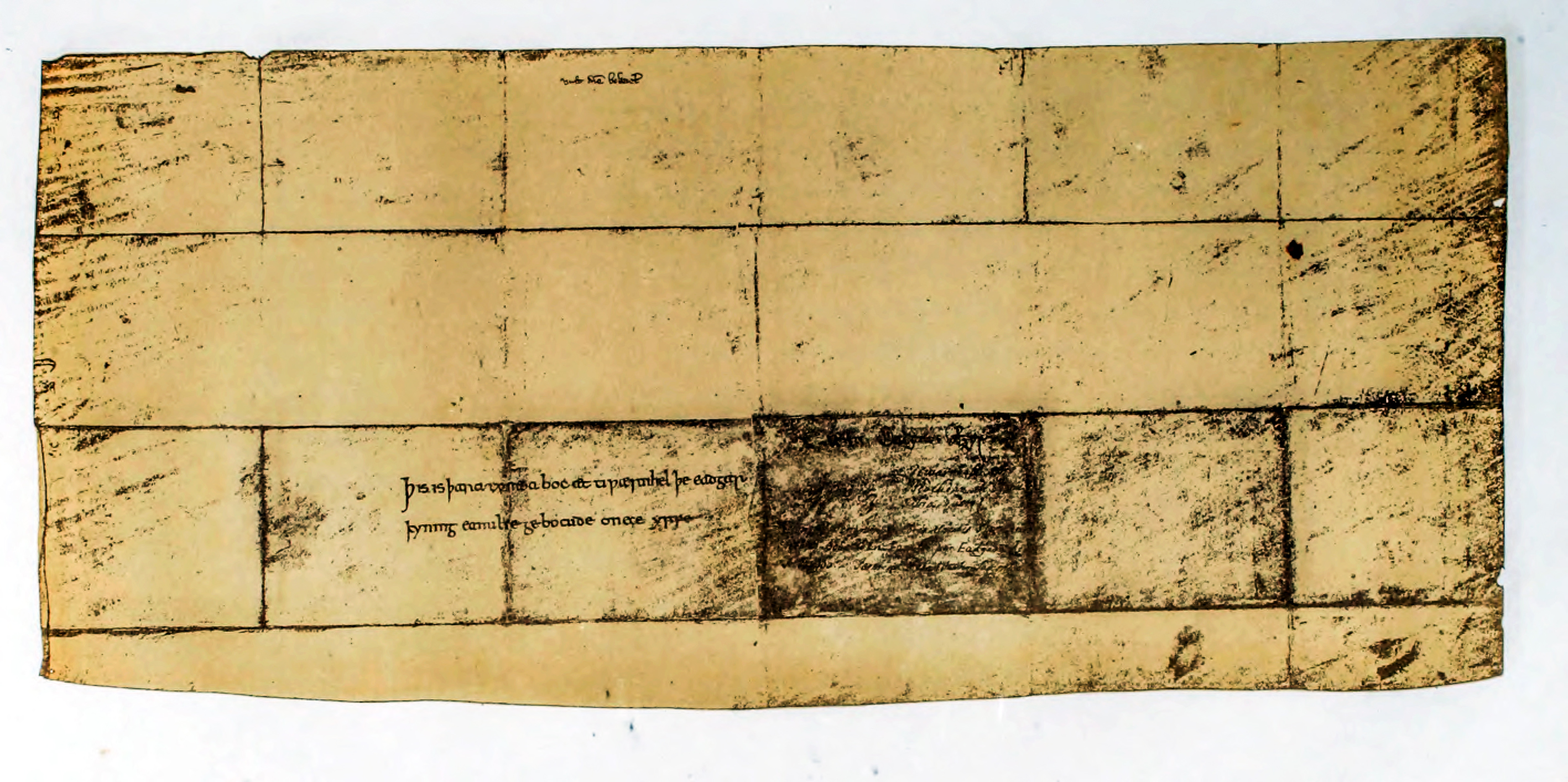
Charter verso

The charter covers a land grant of some 9 hides (cassati) at Tywarnhayle in modern parishes of Perranzabuloe and St Agnes, and 2 mansae at Bosowsa in modern Ladock, both Cornwall. It was granted by King Edgar to his "faithful minister" or thegn Eanulf or Eanwulf who appears in the PASE database as "Eanwulf 20" and is a unique entry, however he could be the same as one of the other 24 Eanwulfs attested in the database.

It is witnessed by 24 individuals in total including King Edgar himself: 8 bishops (episcopae), 6 ealdormen (duces), 6 thegns (ministers) and 3 other individuals.

=== Boundary Clause ===
Hooke (1994, pp.28–32) translates the boundary clause, written in old English, as:

First to pen altiug, then to the old dyke to the crucifix, from the crucifix to ƿelentlnes gate, thence to the boundary dyke, from the boundary dyke to (the) stream to ƿorƿig ford, thence to munnenno, thence to (St) Piran’s tor, from (St) Piran’s tor to weIm tor, thence to/by the old road to beƿcyric, thence on along the road to dofen soðo, thence by (the) way to cofer fros, thence by the stream to (the) sea to noncuic.

== Text ==
The translated text after Sanders (1878). The boundary clause has been left in old English but is translated above:

✠ Our Lord Jesus Christ reigneth for ever! The traditions of the various decrees of mortals and the vicissitudes of the times should be committed to the testimony of writing, lest the successive race of posterity be plunged in the whirlpool of falsehood and the obscurity of ignorance. Wherefore I, King Edgar, relying upon the royal authority have sufficiently, devotedly, taken care to bestow upon my faithful thegn, by name Eanulf, a certain small, portion of land, that is ten cassates, in the place which is called Tiwærnhel, and elsewhere two manses, where it is called Bodeudan, that he may have free power of having and bestowing or leaving it to whatsoever heir he may please. Moreover let the aforesaid land be exempt from all secular burden, except army service, castle ward and bridge building. Whoever shall endeavor to diminish or transmute this decree, let him know that he will be arraigned on the day of judgement before Christ and his saints unless he here make satisfactory amends. The schedule also of this grant is written in the year of the dominical incarnation 960, the 3rd indication, and confirmed by these witnesses whose names are seen represented in little letters below.

✠ I, Eadgar King, have confirmed this my grant ✠ I Dunstan bishop consent and subscribe ✠ I Oskytel bishop consent and subscribe ✠ I Byrhthelm bishop consent and subscribe ✠ I Alfƿold bishop consent and subscribe ✠ I Byrhthelm bishop consent and subscribe ✠ I Kynesige bishop consent and subscribe ✠ I Osulf bishop consent and subscribe ✠ I Aþulf consent and subscribe ✠ I ælfhere ealdorman consent ✠ I ælfgrer consent ✠ I ælfheah ealdorman consent ✠ I byrhtferþ consensi ✠ I æþelstan ealdorman consent ✠ I aþelƿold ealdorman consent ✠ I eadmund ealdorman consent ✠ I byrhtnoþ ealdorman consent ✠ I ælfƿine consent ✠ I eadric thegn consent ✠ I kyneric thegn consent ✠ I aelfsige thegn consent ✠ I ealdred thegn consent ✠ I ordgaer thegn consent ✠ I æþelƿeard thegn consent

The boundaries of the estate are these. Ærest on pen alting þonne on þa ealdan die on þæt cristelmael . of þam cristelmæle on ƿelentines get þanon on finfos of finfos on stream to hryd ƿorƿig þanon on uninnenno þanon to carnperan of carnperan to carnƿelm ƿanon on þa ealdan stræt to beþcyƿre þanon forp on stræt to dofen soðo þanon on ƿeg on cofer fros þanon on stream to sre on non cuic.

== Bibliography ==
- Chaplais, Pierre (1966). "The Authenticity of the Royal Anglo-Saxon Diplomas of Exeter". Historical Research. 39 (99): 12–13. doi:10.1111/j.1468-2281.1966.tb00662.x.
- Davidson, James B. (1883). "On Some Anglo-Saxon Charters at Exeter". Journal of the British Archaeological Association. 39 (3): 269–272. doi:10.1080/00681288.1883.11887848. hdl:2027/hvd.32044081133175.
- Hooke, Della (1994). Pre-conquest Charter-bounds of Devon and Cornwall. Boydell & Brewer. ISBN 978-0-85115-354-4.
- Sanders, William Basevi (1872). Facsimiles of Anglo-Saxon manuscripts. Vol. 2. Southampton: Ordnance Survey. pp. 97–101.
- Whitelock, Dorothy (1955). English Historical Documents: 500-1042. Vol. 1. Eyre & Spottiswoode.

== See also ==
- Charter of Lesneague and Pennarth
- Charter of St Buryan
- Anglo Saxon Charters
- History of Cornwall
- Prosopography of Anglo Saxon England
- Diplomatics
- List of Anglo-Saxon Charters
