= Traboe =

Hamlet in Cornwall, England

Coordinates: 50°3′N 5°9′W

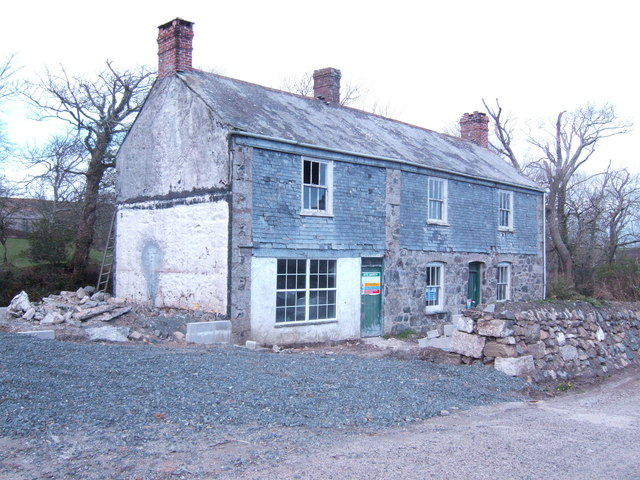
A cottage in Traboe

Traboe (pronounced tray-bow) (Standard Written Form: Treworabo) is a hamlet on the Lizard Peninsula, Cornwall, England, United Kingdom. Traboe is about 5 km west of St Keverne; nearby is Traboe Cross, a junction on the B3293 road. It is approximately a mile down the road from Goonhilly Satellite Earth Station. It contains eleven houses and a building which used to house Rosuick Farm Shop, this being the purpose for which it was built. The list of houses includes a converted inn and a converted school house.

There is a well situated at the back of the green. A tree was planted on the green by residents of the hamlet to commemorate the millennium.

Traboe lies within the Cornwall Area of Outstanding Natural Beauty (AONB).

The name Traboe is a contraction of the Cornish language Treworabo, which contains the elements tre, meaning 'farm' or 'settlement', and Gworabo, a personal name.

== History ==
In 967 AD King Edgar granted to Wulfnoth Rumuncant land in the Charter of Lesneague and Pennarth. Later in 977 AD Edward the Martyr granted Traboe, Trevallack and Grugwith to the historian Æthelweard; the same lands were then granted to Bishop Ealdred of Cornwall 72 years later in 1059. Lesneague, together with Traboe, were later granted to the Benedictine monks of St Michael's Mount by Robert Count of Mortain.

== See also ==
- Charter of Traboe
- Charter of Lesneague and Penarth
