= Burhweald =

11th-century Bishop of Cornwall

- Bishop of Cornwall
- In office: between 1011 and 1012
- Predecessor: Æthelred of Cornwall
- Successor: Lyfing of Winchester

Orders
- Consecration: between 1011 and 1012

Personal details
- Died: between 1019 and 1027
- Denomination: Christian

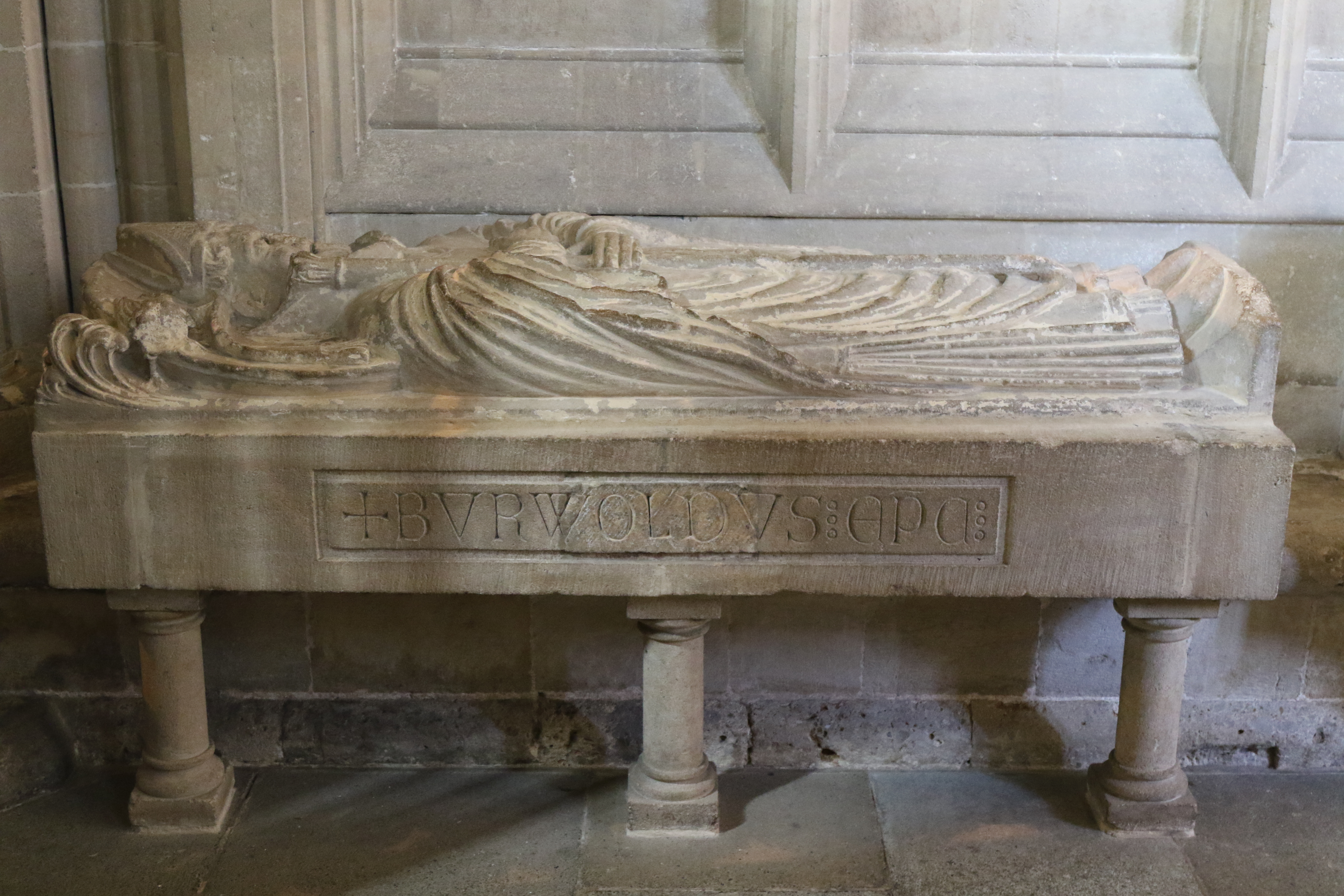
Tomb of Bishop Burwaldus in Wells Cathedral

Burhweald (also Brihtwold) was a medieval Bishop of Cornwall.

Burhweald was consecrated between 1011 and 1012. He died between 1019 and 1027. He was succeeded by his nephew Lyfing by 1027. The earliest recorded reference to a church at Landrake dates from 1018, when King Cnut granted land to Bishop Burhwold, after which it was to pass to St Germans Priory.

== Citations ==
Christian titles
Preceded by Æthelred of Cornwall	Bishop of Cornwall c. 1011–c. 1023	Succeeded by Lyfing of Winchester
