= Abbot of Tavistock =

List of medieval abbots of Tavistock Abbey in England

Abbot of Tavistock was the title of the abbot of Tavistock Abbey in Devon, England. The name of the first abbot is unknown, but the abbey was founded between 975 and 980. Unless otherwise specified the details in the following table are from Heads of Religious Houses: England & Wales 940–1216.

Name	Dates	Notes
unknown	c.975	First abbot
Ælfmær	994–c1009	Became bishop of Selsey
Lyfing of Winchester	c.1009–1027	Became bishop of Worcester
Aldred	c. 1027–c. 1043	Became bishop of Worcester
Sihtric	c. 1043–1069	Became a pirate
Geoffrey	c. 1082–c. 1088	
Wimund	before 1096–1102	Deposed by the Synod of Westminster in 1102
Osbert	?–before1131	
Robert of Plympton	c. 1131–1145	
?Roger	c. 1146	
Robert Postel	c. 1146–1154	
Walter of Winchester	c. 1154–c. 1168	
Godfrey	c. 1168–c. 1173	
Baldwin	1174–1184	
Herbert	1186–1200	
Andrew	1200–1202	
Jordan	c. 1203–1219/1220	
William of Kernit	1220	
John of Rofa	1224	
Alan of Cornwall	1233	Previously prior of Tresco
Robert of Kitecnol	1248	
Thomas	1248	
Henry of Northampton	1257	
Philip Trencheful	1259	
(vacant)	1259	Appointment lapsed to Walter Branscombe, Bishop of Exeter.
Alured	1260	
John Chubbe	1262–1269	Deposed by Bishop Branscombe
Robert Colbern	1270	
Robert Campbell/Champeaux	1285–1325 (died)	"Of the abbots in the later monastic period ... probably ... the greatest and wisest"
(vacant)	1325–1328	Dispute between two candidates, Robert Busse and John Courtenay (eldest son of Hugh de Courtenay, 9th Earl of Devon)
Robert(?) Bonus	1328—1333 (excommunicated)	Bishop Grandisson said of him "That Abbot's name was Good, but he was a scoundrel, a near-heretic!"
John Courtenay	1334	Suspended by Bishop Grandisson for maladministration
Richard Esse	1349	
Stephen Langdon	1362	
Thomas Cullyng	1380 or 1381	The last of five abbots after Campbell who were all accused of waste, extravagance and neglecting their spiritual duties.
John Mey	20 July 1402	
Thomas Mede	March 1422 – April 1442	
Thomas Crispyn	11 June 1442 – 5 April 1447	
William Pewe	2 May 1447 – 26 December 1450	
John Dynyngton	February 1451 – December 1490	
Richard Yeme	February 1491 – c. March 1492	
Richard Banham	1492–1523	
John Peryn	1523–1539	Last abbot
