= Three Brothers of Grugith =

The Three Brothers of Grugith
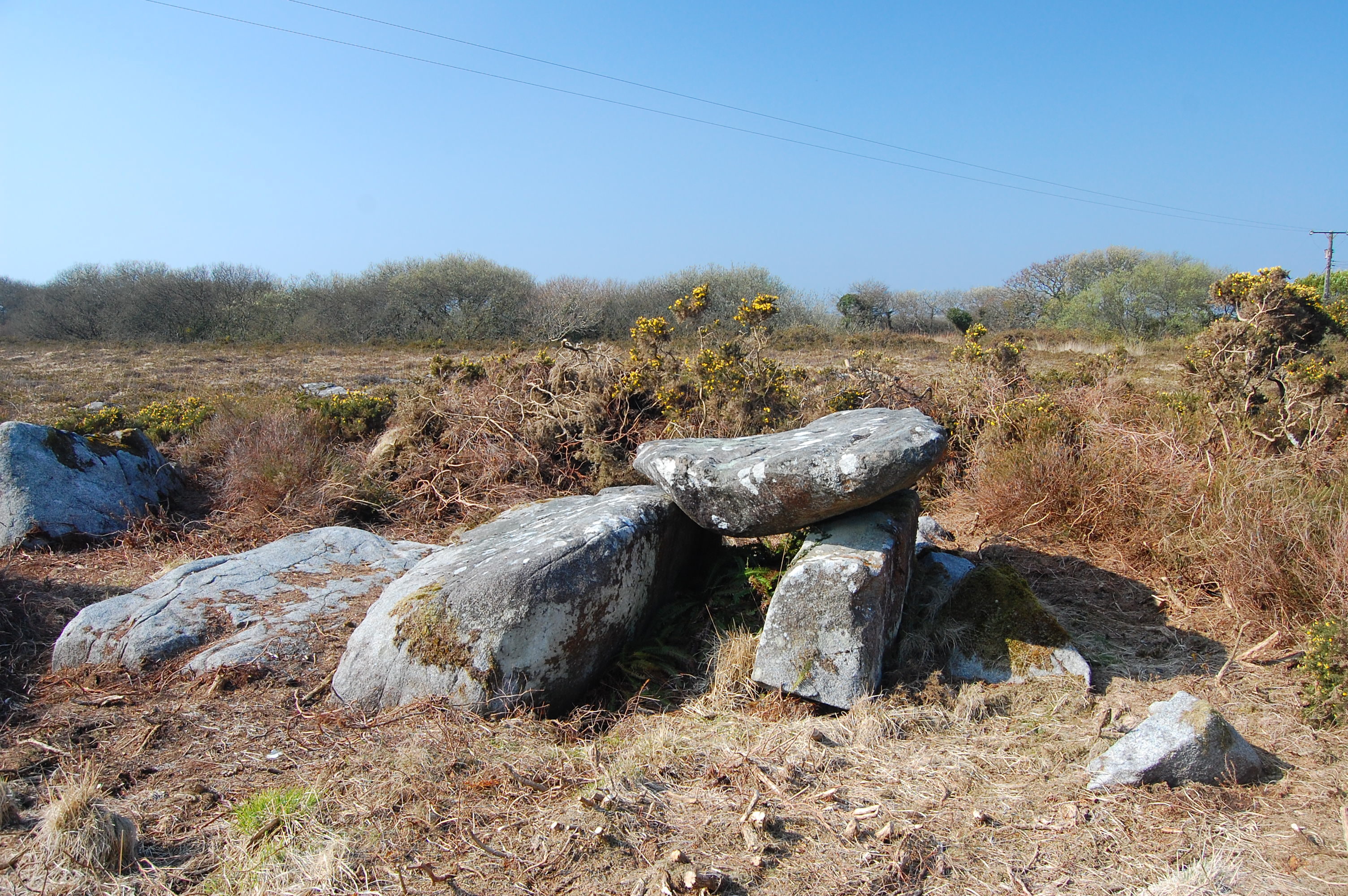
- Viewed from the east

- Location within Cornwall
- 50°2′9.960″N 5°7′37.488″W
- Type: Dolmen
- Periods: Neolithic
- Location: Near St Keverne, Cornwall
- OS grid reference: SW 762 198

Scheduled monument
- Official name: Portal dolmen known as 'The Three Brothers of Grugith'
- Designated: 10 August 1923
- Reference no.: 1006746

The Three Brothers of Grugith (Cornish: An Tri Broder a Grugwydh) is a prehistoric site, a dolmen of the Neolithic Age, near St Keverne in Cornwall, England. It is a scheduled monument.

== Description ==
The dolmen is situated near the summit of a hill overlooking Goonhilly Downs. Two orthostats support a capstone; there are depressions on the capstone which may be cup marks, or may be naturally formed.

The chamber enclosed by the stones measures about 4 by 2 metres (13.1 by 6.6 ft), height about 1 metre (3 ft 3 in). William Copeland Borlase excavated the chamber in 1872: he discovered a pit about 1 metre (3 ft 3 in) deep, and one flint flake.
