= Conan of Cornwall =

10th-century Bishop of Cornwall

Conan
- Bishop of Cornwall
- Appointed: between July 924 and 932
- Term ended: between 937 and 955
- Successor: Daniel of Cornwall

Orders
- Consecration: between July 924 and 932

Personal details
- Died: between 946 or 953 and November 955
- Denomination: Christian

Conan was a medieval Bishop of Cornwall.

Conan was nominated by King Æthelstan. He was consecrated between July 924 and 932. He died between 946 or 953 and November 955.

However, in the view of historian D. P. Kirby, it was almost certainly in 936 that Æthelstan "established Bishop Conan at St. Germans".

== As Witness ==
Conan is cited as a witness in the following charters, given by their Sawyer number:

S391, S407, S412, S413, S416, S417, S418a, S425, S434, S435, S450, S455

== Citations ==
Christian titles
Preceded by	Bishop of Cornwall c. 926–c. 950	Succeeded by Daniel of Cornwall
