= Kate Devlin =

Northern Irish computer scientist, AI specialist

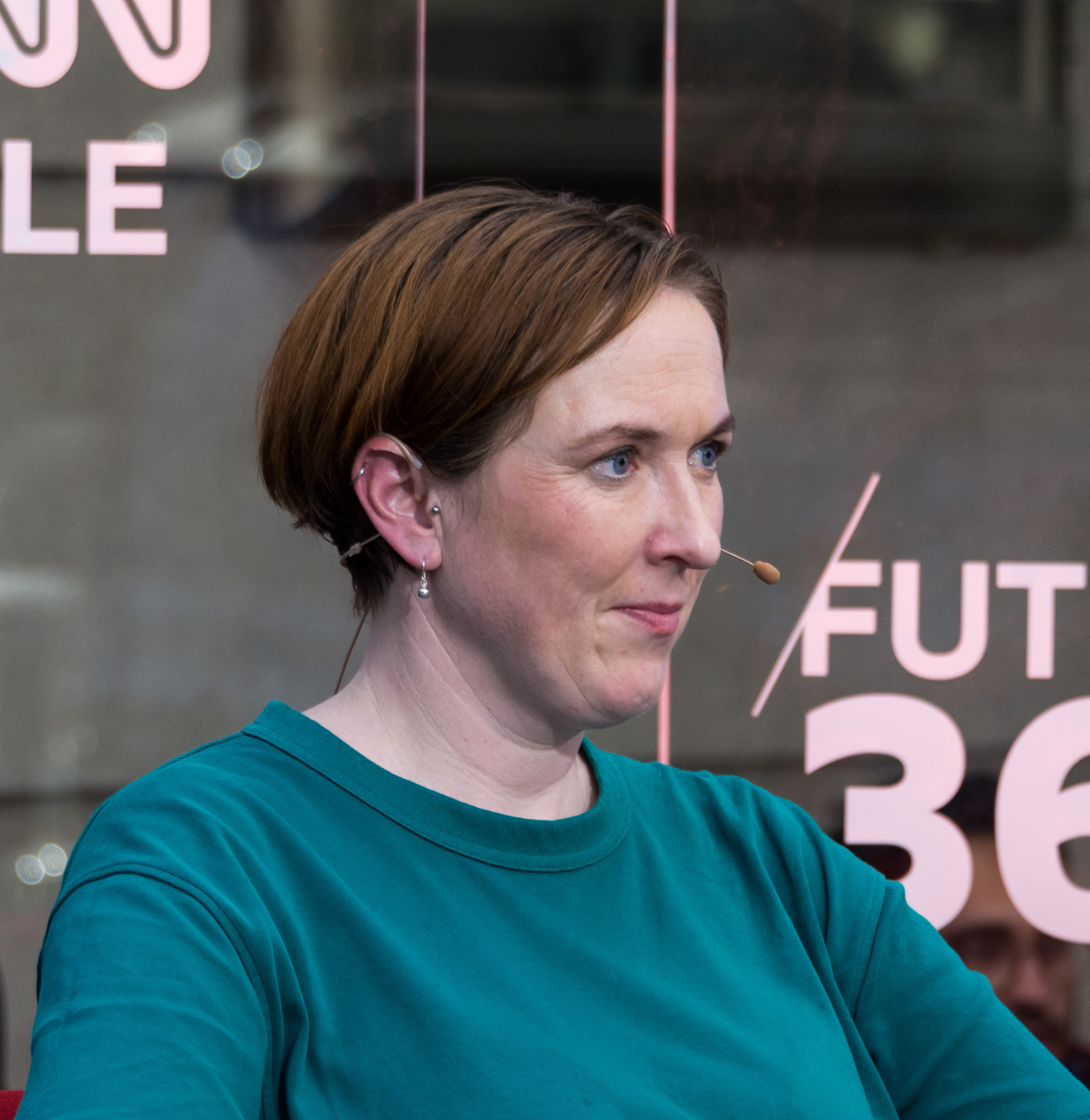
- Devlin in 2020
- Born: Adela Katharine Devlin; 1975 or 1976 (age 50–51); Northern Ireland
- Education: Queen's University Belfast; University of Bristol
- Known for: Computer science, artificial intelligence, archaeology
- Scientific career
- Workplaces: King's College London
- Website: http://www.drkatedevlin.co.uk

Adela Katharine Devlin (born 1975 or 1976 (age 50–51)), is a Northern Irish computer scientist specialising in Artificial intelligence and Human–computer interaction (HCI). She is best known for her work on human sexuality and robotics and was co-chair of the annual Love and Sex with Robots conference in 2016 held in London and was founder of the UK's first ever sex tech hackathon held in 2016 at Goldsmiths, University of London. She is Professor of Artificial Intelligence and Society in the Department of Digital Humanities, King's College London and is the author of Turned On: Science, Sex and Robots in addition to several academic papers.

== Education ==
Devlin began her university career in the humanities and graduated from Queen's University Belfast in 1997 with a BA (Honours) degree in archaeology. After deciding that archaeology presented her with limited future prospects, she returned to Queen's University to study computer science, and in 1999 she was awarded an MSc in that subject. She then moved to The University of Bristol, where in 2004 she was awarded a PhD in computer science.

Devlin became a Senior Lecturer in the Department of Computing at Goldsmiths, University of London and a departmental Senior Tutor. and on 1 September 2018, Devlin became the Senior Lecturer in Social & Cultural AI in the Digital Humanities department at King's College London.

== Academic career ==
In 2003 Devlin began researching computer graphics in archaeology at Bristol University, rendering 3D computer models of archaeological sites such as at Pompeii with attention to realistically rendering lighting effects caused by the spectral composition of light sources available at the time period in history. This involved experimental archaeology, recreating light sources and analysing the spectral range for each type of candle or fuel lamp.

From 2007 Devlin worked in the field of human-computer interaction and artificial intelligence at Goldsmiths, which included programming, graphics and animation. In 2018 she became Senior Lecturer in Social and Cultural Artificial Intelligence in the Department of Digital Humanities, King's College London.

In 2015 Devlin spoke to news broadcasters in the UK about institutionalised sexism within science research and academia after comments made by Sir Tim Hunt regarding women scientists working in mixed laboratories. While Devlin, along with many other commentators, acknowledged the comments to be 'banter' she expressed the frustration that many women have with sexism in the fields of science, technology, engineering, and mathematics and jokingly tweeted that she couldn't chair a departmental meeting because she was "too busy swooning and crying." Devlin also speaks publicly and writes to encourage more women to pursue technology careers.

In 2016 Devlin co-chaired the International Congress on Love and Sex With Robots held in London, UK, an annual conference held since 2014, co-founded by Adrian David Cheok and David Levy, writer of the book of the same name, Love and Sex with Robots.

Also, in 2016, Devlin founded the first UK sex technology (sex tech) hackathon, a conference where scientists, students, academics and other people in the sex tech industry meet to pool ideas and build projects in the field of sex and intimacy with artificial partners.

In 2016 Devlin appeared several times in the media debating ethical issues concerning sex robots with Kathleen Richardson, fellow of the ethics of robotics at De Montfort University, and founder of Campaign Against Sex Robots which seeks to ban sex robots on the grounds that they encourage isolation, perpetuate the idea of women as property and are dehumanising. Devlin has argued that not only would a ban be impractical, but as technology develops more women need to be involved to diversify a field which is dominated by men creating products for heterosexual men. She also points out that the technology can be used as therapy, citing the use of artificial intelligence to treat anxiety, and the possible application towards understanding the psychology of sex offenders.

Devlin frequently speaks at conferences and her areas of scientific interest include: the social and ethical problems of integrating artificial intelligence into sexual experience with computer systems and robots, the human and social consequences of AI as it becomes more sophisticated, and improving human sexual relationships by moving away from a "hetero-normative male view" of sex and intimacy using sex toys, robots and computer software. She has raised issues which she believes need addressing as this technology develops. These concerns include: if robots gain self-awareness, will they be able to give informed consent and be entitled to make choices regarding their own desires, and should they be supplied to the elderly in residential care facilities for companionship and sex.

Devlin was named one of London's most influential people of 2017 by the Progress 1000, London Evening Standard.

In 2018 Devlin released her book, Turned On: Science, Sex and Robots. The book began as research into the technological development of sex robots and explores the relationship between technology and intimacy. Engineering & Technology (E&T) magazine described the book as "a creative, optimistic, open-minded exploration of sex robots", particularly in its discussion on current sex technology. The Times described it as "illuminating, witty and written with a wide open mind".

A humanist, Devlin was appointed a patron of Humanists UK and Northern Ireland Humanists in 2022 for her "contribution to the greater public understanding of science". Since 2023, she has represented Humanists UK as a Commissioner to the AI Faith & Civil Society Commission examining ethical questions around AI safety. In 2025, she advised on what would become the Humanists International's Luxembourg Declaration on Artificial Intelligence and Human Values, a framework for exploring ethical responses to the emerging challenges posed by AI. In 2026, she was appointed to the new Editorial Board of the 140-year-old humanist publication New Humanist.

In 2024, she was appointed Chair-Director of Kings College London's Digital Futures Institute.

== Publications ==
=== Books ===
- Paradata and Transparency in Virtual Heritage, contributor, 2012
- Turned On: Science, Sex and Robots. Bloomsbury Sigma, 2018
- Love and sex with robots : second International Conference, LSR 2016, London, UK, 19–20 December 2016, Revised selected papers

=== Selected papers ===
- Realistic visualisation of the Pompeii frescoes (2001) (with Alan Chalmers)
- Dynamic range reduction inspired by photoreceptor physiology (2005) (with Erik Reinhard)
- Current Practice in Digital Imaging in UK Archaeology (2006) (with Alice Chuter)
- Visual calibration and correction for ambient illumination (2006) (with Alan Chalmers, Erik Reinhard)
- Investigating Sensorimotor Contingencies in the Enactive Interface (2014) (with Janet K. Gibbs)
- One-Touch Pose Detection on Touchscreen Smartphones (2015) (with Karsten Seipp)

=== Media ===
Devlin has written for the New Scientist, The Conversation and has presented a TEDx talk entitled Sex Robots.

== Personal life ==
Devlin has spoken publicly about living with bipolar disorder and epilepsy and how stress can affect both her academic and professional life, as well as how important it is to bring mental health issues into public debate to reduce the stigma attached.

Devlin is open about her consensually non-monogamous relationships and has written about her experiences of polyamory.

She is also interested in, and has researched, the life story of Adela Breton, the Victorian archaeologist and explorer, and contributed to the Raising Horizons exhibition of 'trowel-blazing' women throughout the history of archaeology and geology.

She is divorced and has a son.

== See also ==
- Time to Change (mental health campaign)
- Virtual archaeology
