= Keverne =

Cornish saint

Saint Achevran or Achovran (fl. before 10th c.), often called Akeveranus and in modern times Keverne or Kerrian, was a Cornish saint, noted since at least 1086 and probably before the 10th century. Little is known about Achevran's life or sanctification, but his name is found in multiple instances throughout the last millennium in Devon and Cornwall, most prominently the village of St Keverne on The Lizard and the St Kerrian Church in Exeter.

The name Achobran appears in a 10th-century list of Cornish saints, the Vatican codex Reginensis Latinus 191, and it is probable that this is the same person. Originally an independent figure, Achevran was equated with the Irish saint Ciarán of Saigir by 1266, and later both became equated with Saint Piran. During the Reformation, the popular and more correct spelling, Keverne, came back into use again.

A legend tells that St. Just of Penwith, after visiting St. Keverne, absconded with his chalice. His host threw three rocks at the thief as he was going westwards. These fell in a field on the road from Helston to Marazion, not far from Germoe, and were known as Tremenkeverne, or the Three Stones of Keverne.
