= Lyfing of Winchester =

Bishop of Crediton, Worcester and Cornwall (died 1046)

- Bishop of Crediton
- Province: Province of Canterbury
- Appointed: 1027
- Term ended: 1046
- Predecessor: Eadnoth
- Successor: Leofric
- Other posts: Bishop of Worcester; Bishop of Cornwall
- Previous post: Abbot of Tavistock

Orders
- Consecration: 1027

Personal details
- Died: 20, 23 or 25 March 1046
- Denomination: Christian

Lyfing of Winchester (Note: Also known as Livingus or Lifing) (died March 1046) was an Anglo-Saxon prelate who served as Bishop of Worcester, Bishop of Crediton and Bishop of Cornwall.

== Life ==
Lyfing's uncle was Burhweald, Bishop of Cornwall, according to the medieval chronicler William of Malmesbury. He was probably a monk either at Winchester Abbey or at Glastonbury Abbey. In 1009, he became Abbot of Tavistock, and that was always his favourite of the offices he held. In 1027, he became the Bishop of Crediton, and about the same time he became Bishop of Cornwall on the death of his uncle Brihtwold, so he united those two sees, with the seat at Crediton. His elevation probably was due both to his family and to his assistance to Cnut in Rome. There is also some indication he may have been a protégé of Godwin, Earl of Wessex.

In 1038 or 1039, Lyfing also became Bishop of Worcester, but was deprived of the see in 1040. King Harold Harefoot gave Worcester to Lyfing because of Lyfing's support of Harold. His deprivation was due to King Harthacnut's belief that Lyfing was involved in the death of Harthacnut's half brother Alfred Atheling. Lyfing was accused by Aelfric Puttoc, the archbishop of York, who briefly replaced Lyfing at Worcester. Lyfing seems to have claimed that he was merely following the orders of Harold Harefoot. However, he was restored to Worcester in 1041 and held the three sees until his death on 20, 23 or 25 March 1046.

Lyfing was a close friend and trusted counsellor of King Canute the Great and accompanied him on a pilgrimage to Rome in 1027. Florence of Worcester, the medieval chronicler, claims that Lyfing, along with Godwin, was instrumental in securing the succession of Edward the Confessor to the throne of England on Harthacnut's death. A tradition at Worcester also recorded that it was Lyfing, along with Archbishop Eadsige of Canterbury, who forced Sweyn Godwinson to release Eadgifu, the abbess of Leominster whom Sweyn had kidnapped. In revenge, Sweyn raided the lands of the diocese of Worcester.

Before Lyfing's death, Aldred, who succeeded him at Worcester, had probably been acting as his suffragan or co-bishop. When Lyfing died, he chose to be buried at Tavistock Abbey. Lyfing was a pluralist and never enjoyed a good reputation. However, the D version of the Anglo-Saxon Chronicle describes him as "the eloquent bishop", which may imply that he was noted as an important preacher. Tavistock monks also remembered him as a great benefactor to their monastery.

== Citations ==
Christian titles
Preceded by Ælfmær	Abbot of Tavistock c. 1009–1027	Succeeded by Ealdred
Preceded by Eadnoth	Bishop of Crediton; 1027–1046	Succeeded by Leofric
Preceded by Burhweald	Bishop of Cornwall; 1027–1046	Succeeded by Leofric
Preceded by Beorhtheah	Bishop of Worcester; 1038 or 1039 – deprived 1040	Succeeded by Aelfric Puttoc
Preceded by Aelfric Puttoc	Bishop of Worcester restored 1041–1046	Succeeded by Ealdred
