= Laddenvean =

Village in the United Kingdom

Coordinates: 50.05273°N 5.09397°W

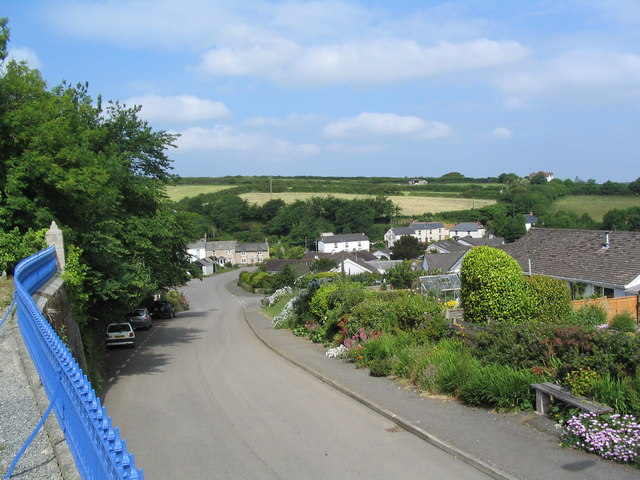
Laddenvean from St Keverne

Laddenvean (Cornish: Ladnvian) is a small settlement in southwest Cornwall, England, United Kingdom. It lies immediately north of, and adjoins, St Keverne village 7 miles (11 km) south of Falmouth.

The name Laddenvean comes from the Cornish language Ladnvian, which contains the elements ladn 'enclosure' and vian 'little'.
