= Æthelred of Cornwall =

11th-century Bishop of Cornwall

Æthelred
- Bishop of Cornwall
- In office: c. 1001
- Predecessor: Ealdred of Cornwall
- Successor: Burhweald

Personal details
- Died: after 1001
- Denomination: Christian

Æthelred was a medieval Bishop of Cornwall.

Æthelred was bishop about 1001 and died sometime after that.

== Citations ==
Christian titles
Preceded by Ealdred of Cornwall	Bishop of Cornwall c. 1001	Succeeded by Burhweald
