= Roy Wisbey =

British pioneer of humanities computing

Roy A. Wisbey
- Born: 13 June 1929; Bishop's Stortford, Hertfordshire
- Died: 21 October 2020 (aged 91); Cambridge
- Occupation: University lecturer
- Title: Professor of German
- Spouse: Ernestine Birochs (m. 1951; died 2020)
- Awards: Order of Merit of the Federal Republic of Germany; Decoration of Honour for Services to the Republic of Austria

Academic background
- Education: Bishop's Stortford College
- Alma mater: Queens' College, Cambridge; Goethe University Frankfurt
- Thesis: Das Alexanderbild Rudolfs von Ems (1955)
- Doctoral advisor: Julius Schwietering

Academic work
- Discipline: German language and literature; Humanities computing
- Sub-discipline: Medieval German Literature
- Institutions: University of Durham; University of Cambridge; King's College, London
- Notable students: Brian O. Murdoch
- Main interests: Gottfried's Tristan

Roy Albert Wisbey (13 June 1929 – 21 October 2020) was a British medievalist, Professor of German at King's College, London, and one of the leading figures in British German studies. He was also a pioneer in the field of digital humanities, founding the Literary and Linguistic Computing Centre in Cambridge in 1964 and later promoting the establishment of the Centre for Computing in the Humanities at King's. Over a period of 40 years he led the transformation of the Modern Humanities Research Association (MHRA) into a major scholarly publisher. He was recognised by both the German and Austrian governments for his contribution to German Studies.

== Education ==
Roy Wisbey was born on 13 June 1929 in Bishop's Stortford, Hertfordshire, to working-class parents Albert and Mary Wisbey. He was educated at Bishop's Stortford College and did his National Service as a Chief Instructor in the Royal Army Educational Corps. He won an Open Scholarship to Queens' College, Cambridge, matriculating in October 1949. He achieved a first class degree in the Modern and Medieval Languages Tripos and graduated in 1952. He studied in Germany 1952–1955, earning a doctorate under Julius Schwietering at the Johann Wolfgang Goethe-Universität, Frankfurt-am-Main. His 1956 thesis Das Alexanderbild Rudolfs von Ems was published in 1966.

== Academic career ==
Roy Wisbey's first academic post was as a Research fellow at Bedford College, London, where he spent the year 1955–1956, after which he was appointed to a lectureship in German at the University of Durham, where he taught German literature from the sixteenth century to the modern day.

In 1958 he moved to Cambridge to take up a lectureship in Medieval German Literature at the Faculty of Modern and Medieval Languages, and he also became a Fellow of Downing College. It was at this point that he became interested in the possibilities offered by computer concordances of medieval texts, which led to him establishing the university's Literary and Linguistic Computing Centre in 1964.

From 1971 to his retirement in 1994 he was Professor of German and Head of German at King's College London.

== Selected publications ==
Dr Roy Wisbey and Mr Frank Bott examine punched tape "hot" from the computer, 1965.

=== Middle High German literature ===
- Wisbey, Roy (1954–1955). "Die Aristotelesrede bei Walter von Châtillon und Rudolf von Ems". Zeitschrift für deutsches Altertum und deutsche Literatur. 85 (4): 304–311. JSTOR 20654703.
- ———— (1966). Das Alexanderbild Rudolfs von Ems. Philologische Studien und Quellen, 31. Berlin: Erich Schmidt.
- Wisbey, R A (1980). "The Renovatio Amoris in Gottfried's Tristan". In Bock, C V (ed.). London German Studies I. London: Institute of Germanic Studies. ISBN 978-0-85457-095-9.
- Wisbey, Roy (1982). "Fortune and love, reason and the senses: traditional motifs in Walther's song 'Ich freudehelfelôser man (L54, 37ff.)". Oxford German Studies. 13: 115–142. doi:10.1179/ogs.1982.13.1.115.
- ———— (1990). "Living in the presence of the past: exemplary perspectives in Gottfried's Tristan". In Stevens, Adrian; Wisbey, Roy (eds.). Gottfried von Strassburg and the Medieval Tristan Legend. Papers from an Anglo-North American Symposium. London: Institute of German Studies. pp. 257–276. ISBN 0-85457-146-9.
- ———— (2003). "Tristan: On Being the Contemporary of Gottfried von Straßburg". Modern Language Review. 98 (4): xxxi–lx. doi:10.2307/3738048. JSTOR 3738048. S2CID 163736541. (The Presidential Address of the Modern Humanities Research Association)

=== Humanities computing ===
- Wisbey, Roy (April 1962). "Concordance Making by Electronic Computer: Some Experiences with the Wiener Genesis". The Modern Language Review. 57 (2). Modern Humanities Research Association: 161–172. doi:10.2307/3720960. JSTOR 3720960.
- Wisbey, R (1963). "The Analysis of Middle High German Texts by Computer - Some Lexicographical Aspects". Transactions of the Philological Society. 62: 28–48. doi:10.1111/j.1467-968X.1963.tb00999.x.
- ———— (1967). Vollständige Verskonkordanz zur Wiener Genesis. Berlin: Erich Schmidt. ISBN 978-3503004737.
- ———— (1968). Complete Concordance to the Vorau and Strassburg Alexander. Leeds: W.S. Maney. ISBN 978-0901286000.
- Wisbey, Roy; Bott, M F (1968). "Literary And Linguistic Computing Centre, Cambridge". In Stindlová, Jitka; Skoumalová, Zdená (eds.). Les machines dans la linguistique. De Gruyter. pp. 39–48. doi:10.1515/9783112315354-009. ISBN 9783112304167.
- Wisbey, Roy (1970). "Ein computerlesbares Textarchiv des Frühmittelhochdeutschen". Jahrbuch für internationale Germanistik. 1 (2): 161–172.
- Wisbey, R. A. (1971). "Publications from a computer-readable archive". In Wisbey, R. A. (ed.). The Computer in literary and linguistic research : papers from a Cambridge symposium. Cambridge: Cambridge University Press. ISBN 9780521081467.
- ———— (1974). "Zur Bedeutung des Computers für die Edition altdeutscher Texte". In Schmidt, Ernst-Joachim (ed.). Kritische Bewahrung: Beiträge zur deutschen Philologie; Festschrift für Werner Schröder zum 60. Geburtstag. Berlin: Erich Schmidt. ISBN 9783503007936.
- Wisbey, Roy (1978). "Die Erschließung eines maschinenlesbaren Text-Archivs des Frühmittelhochdeutschen". In Lenders, Winfried; Moser, Hugo (eds.). Maschinelle Verarbeitung Altdeutscher Texte. Vol. I. Berlin: Erich Schmidt. pp. 117–131. ISBN 978-3503007592.
- Wisbey, R A (1992). "Three Decades of Literary and Linguistic Computing'". In Wisbey, R A (ed.). London German Studies IV. London: Institute of Germanic Studies. ISBN 978-0-85457-158-1.

=== Festschrift ===
- Honemann, Volker, ed. (1994). German Narrative Literature of the Twelfth and Thirteenth Centuries: Studies Presented to Roy Wisbey on His Sixty-fifth Birthday. de Gruyter. ISBN 978-3484102194.

== Sources ==
- Adler, Jeremy (18 December 2020). "Roy Wisbey obituary". The Guardian.
- "Roy Wisbey". European Association for Digital Humanities.
- "In Memoriam: Professor Roy Wisbey FKC". King's College, London. 9 November 2020.
- Jones, Martin; Yeandle, David (April 2021). "OBITUARY: PROFESSOR ROY ALBERT WISBEY (1929–2020)". German Life and Letters. 74 (2): 161–165. doi:10.1111/glal.12303. S2CID 234804782.
- Wells, David (6 December 2020). "Roy Wisbey". Modern Humanities Research Association.
