= Patrick Wormald =

British historian (1947–2009)

Patrick Wormald FSA
- Born: 9 July 1947; Neston, Cheshire, England
- Died: 29 September 2004 (aged 57)
- Occupations: Historian and academic
- Spouse: Jenny Brown (m. 1980; div. 2001)
- Children: 2
- Parent: Brian Wormald (father)

Academic background
- Education: Eton College
- Alma mater: Balliol College, Oxford; Merton College, Oxford

Academic work
- Discipline: History
- Sub-discipline: Early medieval history; History of Anglo-Saxon England; Legal history; Bede
- Institutions: All Souls College, Oxford; University of Glasgow; Christ Church, Oxford; Wolfson College, Oxford
- Notable students: Stephen Baxter

Charles Patrick Wormald (9 July 1947 – 29 September 2004) was a British historian born in Neston, Cheshire, son of historian Brian Wormald.

== Biography ==
His father converted to Roman Catholicism in 1955, in the year the son turned eight. He attended Eton College as a King's Scholar. From 1966 to 1969 he read modern history at Balliol College, Oxford. There, he was tutored by Maurice Keen and farmed out for tutorials with Michael Wallace-Hadrill (at that time a Senior Research Fellow at Merton College, Oxford) and Peter Brown (at that time a research fellow at All Souls College, Oxford). Wormald's potential was subsequently recognised by both Merton and All Souls when those colleges awarded him, respectively, the Harmsworth Senior Scholarship and a seven-year Prize Fellowship.

Wormald taught early medieval history at the University of Glasgow from 1974 to 1988, where his lectures drew huge enthusiasm from students. There he also met fellow-historian Jenny Brown, whom he married in 1980. They had two sons, but divorced in 2001. While at Glasgow, he became a participant in the Bucknell Group of early medievalists, hosted by Wendy Davies – the group taking its name from a village on the Welsh-English border where it often met. He delivered the Jarrow Lecture in 1984.

Following a British Academy Research Readership (1987–89), Wormald returned to Oxford in 1989 as a college lecturer at Christ Church, where he was then appointed a fellow and university lecturer from 1990, tutoring students in medieval history. He delivered the Deerhurst Lecture in 1991 and the British Academy's Raleigh Lecture in History in 1995. In 1996 he gave the inaugural Richard Rawlinson Center Congress Lecture at the 31st International Congress on Medieval Studies in Western Michigan University in Kalamazoo, Michigan. His greatest work, which took many years to produce, was The Making of English Law, the first volume of which was published in 1999. Volume II was unfinished at the time of his death, although his extensive preparatory papers for the book have now been published online. Following his early retirement from Christ Church in 2001, he was re-engaged as a lecturer by the History Faculty at Oxford, and entered Wolfson College, Oxford. He was elected a fellow of the Society of Antiquaries of London in 2003, and that year also delivered the Brixworth Lecture.

In 2009, a collection of essays written by leading scholars in Wormald's honour was published under the title Early Medieval Studies in Memory of Patrick Wormald, edited by Stephen Baxter et al. The book is introduced by articles on Wormald's person and his academic output.

== Select bibliography ==
- 2006, The Times of Bede: Studies in Early English Christian Society and its Historian, ed. Baxter, Stephen.
- 2005, The First Code Of English Law, The Canterbury Commemoration Society 2005 Reprinted 2010.
- 2005, "Kings and kingship" in Fouracre, Paul (ed.), The new Cambridge medieval history: Vol. 1 c.500–c.700.
- 2005, "Germanic power structures: the early English experience" in Scales, Len and Zimmer, Oliver (eds) Power and the Nation in European History, pp. 105–24.
- 2003, "The Leges Barbarorum : law and ethnicity in the post-Roman West" in Goetz, Jarnut, & Pohl (eds), Regna and gentes : the relationship between late antique and early medieval peoples and kingdoms in the transformation of the Roman world.
- 2001 "Kingship and Royal Property from Æthelwulf to Edward the Elder" in Higham & Hill eds, Edward the Elder.
- 1999, The making of English law: King Alfred to the twelfth century, vol. 1: Legislation and its limits.
- 1999, Legal culture in the early medieval west: law as text, image and experience.
- 1998, "Frederic William Maitland and the earliest English law" in Law and History Review, 16.
- 1996, "The emergence of the Regnum Scottorum: a Carolingian hegemony" in Crawford, Barbara (ed.), Scotland in dark age Britain.
- 1993, How do we know so much about Anglo-Saxon Deerhurst?
- 1986, "Celtic and Anglo-Saxon kingship : Some Further Thoughts" in Szarmach, Paul E. & Oggins, Virginia D. (eds), Sources of Anglo-Saxon culture.
- 1983, with Bullough, Donald & Collins, Roger (eds), Ideal and reality in Frankish and Anglo-Saxon Society: studies presented to John Michael Wallace-Hadrill.
- 1982, "The Age of Bede and Æthelbald", "The age of Offa and Alcuin", & "The Ninth Century" in Campbell, James (ed.), The Anglo-Saxons.
- 1978, "Æthelred the lawmaker" in Hill, David (ed.), Ethelred the Unready : papers from the millenary conference.
- 1977, "Lex scripta and verbum regis: legislation and Germanic kingship from Euric to Cnut" in Sawyer, P.H. & Wood, Ian N. (eds), Early medieval kingship.
- 1976, "The Decline of the Western Empire and the Survival of its Aristocracy", Journal of Roman Studies 66.

== Obituaries ==
- "Patrick Wormald". The Daily Telegraph. 27 October 2004.
- Mayr-Harting, Henry (13 October 2004). "Patrick Wormald". The Guardian.
- "Patrick Wormald". The Times. 6 October 2004. Archived from the original on 24 May 2011.
- Campbell, James (7 October 2004). "Patrick Wormald". The Independent. Archived from the original on 22 January 2007.
