= B. H. G. Wormald =

British historian (1912–2005)

- Born: Thomas Brian Harvey Goodwin Wormald; 24 July 1912
- Died: 22 March 2005 (aged 92)
- Other name: Brian Womald
- Spouse: Rosemary Lloyd (m. 1946; died 2003)
- Children: 4, including Patrick

Academic background
- Education: Harrow School
- Alma mater: Peterhouse, Cambridge; St John's College, Cambridge; Chichester Theological College
- Influences: Herbert Butterfield

Academic work
- Discipline: History
- Sub-discipline: Early modern Britain; English Civil War
- Institutions: Peterhouse, Cambridge

Thomas Brian Harvey Goodwin Wormald (24 July 1912 – 22 March 2005), known as Brian Wormald, was a British historian of early modern England.

He was born on 24 July 1912. His father was the Anglican rector of Solihull, Warwickshire. He was educated at Harrow School and Peterhouse, Cambridge, where he obtained a First in both parts of the Historical Tripos, as well as winning academic prizes. He was then a research student at St John's College, Cambridge, before returning to Peterhouse in 1938. He was much influenced by Herbert Butterfield and admired his scepticism towards received wisdom in historical interpretations. Wormald served as junior proctor of the University of Cambridge in 1951–52.

He was ordained as an Anglican deacon during World War II. He attended Chichester Theological College, which had been evacuated to Cambridge. Later, he served as chaplain and dean of Peterhouse. In the 1950s, Wormald became alienated from the Church of England due to what he saw as its backsliding and compromises. He admired Pope Pius XII's definition of the Assumption of Mary. He converted to Roman Catholicism in 1955.

Wormald specialised in seventeenth-century English history, and his first work was a study of Edward Hyde, 1st Earl of Clarendon, which was published in 1951. Wormald demonstrated that the divide between Cavalier and Roundhead did not emerge until shortly before fighting began in 1642, thereby undermining the notion of the English Civil War as "the English Revolution".

== Personal life ==
In 1946, he married Rosemary, the sister of Lord Lloyd (marriage dissolved). They had four sons, one of whom was the historian Patrick Wormald. Rosemary and two of their sons predeceased him. After his death, The Times said: "Wormald had one of the most distinguished historical minds of his generation".

== Works ==
- Clarendon: Politics, History and Religion 1640-1660 (Cambridge University Press, 1951, 1976, 1989). ISBN 0521379539
- Francis Bacon: History, Politics and Science, 1561-1626 (Cambridge University Press, 1993). ISBN 0521307732
