= Harold Short =

Emeritus Professor of King's College London

Professor Harold Short

Academic work
- Discipline: Digital Humanities
- Institutions: King's College London
- Notable works: Prosopography of Anglo-Saxon England

Harold Short is emeritus Professor of King's College London. He founded and directed the Centre for Computing in the Humanities (later Department of Digital Humanities) until his retirement (2010). He was involved in the development with Willard McCarty of the world's first PhD programme in Digital Humanities (2005), and three MA programmes: Digital Humanities, Digital Culture and Society, and Digital Asset Management.

== Education & Career ==
Harold Short arrived in London in 1972 from the former Rhodesia (now Zimbabwe), he took an Open University degree in mathematics, computing and systems, and completed a Postgraduate Certificate in Education, he worked at the BBC as programmer, systems analyst and then systems manager.

In 1988 he moved to King's College London to take up the post of assistant director in Computing Services for Humanities and Information Management.; he founded and directed the Centre for Computing in the Humanities (from 2011 Department of Digital Humanities) until retirement in 2010.

He is a former Chair of the European Association for Digital Humanities (EADH) and the Alliance of Digital Humanities Organizations (ADHO) and is a general editor of the Routledge series Digital Research in the Arts and Humanities.

The biennial Wisbey Lecture was initiated by Harold Short in 2003 to honour the pioneering work of Roy Wisbey in the field of humanities computing.

He was a technical director for the Prosopography of Anglo-Saxon England (PASE) database and website, a research tool about people that lived in Anglo-Saxon England. he also supervised the Technical research of the Clergy of the Church of England database.

During 2011 to 2015 he was a visiting professor at Western Sydney University, where he was involved in establishing the Digital Humanities Research Group, which hosted the 2015 Digital Humanities conference.

Since 2016 he is a Visiting Professorial Fellow at Australian Catholic University in Sydney, where he is co-director of the Julfa Cemetery Digital Repatriation Project.

== Publications ==
- Bradley, John; Short, Harold; (2005) "Texts into databases: the evolving field of new-style prosopography", Literary and linguistic computing, 20 Suppl 1, 3-24.
- A Road map for Humanities Computing, Willard McCarty and Harold Short (2002 - report)

== See also ==
Prosopography of Anglo-Saxon England
