= Humanistic informatics =

Field of study

Humanistic informatics is one of several names chosen for the study of the relationship between human culture and technology. The term is fairly common in Europe, but is little known in the English-speaking world, though digital humanities (also known as humanities computing) is in many cases roughly equivalent.

Humanistic informatics departments were generally started in the 1990s when universities rarely taught humanities-based approaches to the rapidly developing computerized society. For this reason, the field was quite broadly defined, and included courses in humanities computing, basic introductions to how computers work, historical developments of technology, technology and learning, digital art and literature and digital culture. Today several departments have declared more specialized areas of research, such as digital arts and culture at the University of Bergen, and socio-cultural communication with and without technology at the University of Aalborg.

Digital humanities is a primary topic, and there are several universities in the US and the UK that have digital arts and humanities research and development centers. One aspect of digital humanities that will grow will be the intersection of new digital media and the humanities, particularly in the gaming industry which has developed both casual and serious gaming and game design strategies to foster learning in the humanities and all other academic disciplines. A key principle in all digital interactive media or games is the storyline; the narrative or quest or goal of the game is primary to both literary works and games. Characters and players go on the quest, and playing the game becomes the narrative. Game design principles, also relevant in literature and the fine arts, include visual literacy and empowering players/learners to align with great artists and writers who believe in the creative process.
