= Department of Digital Humanities, King's College London =

UK academic department

Coordinates: 51.511517°N 0.115850°W

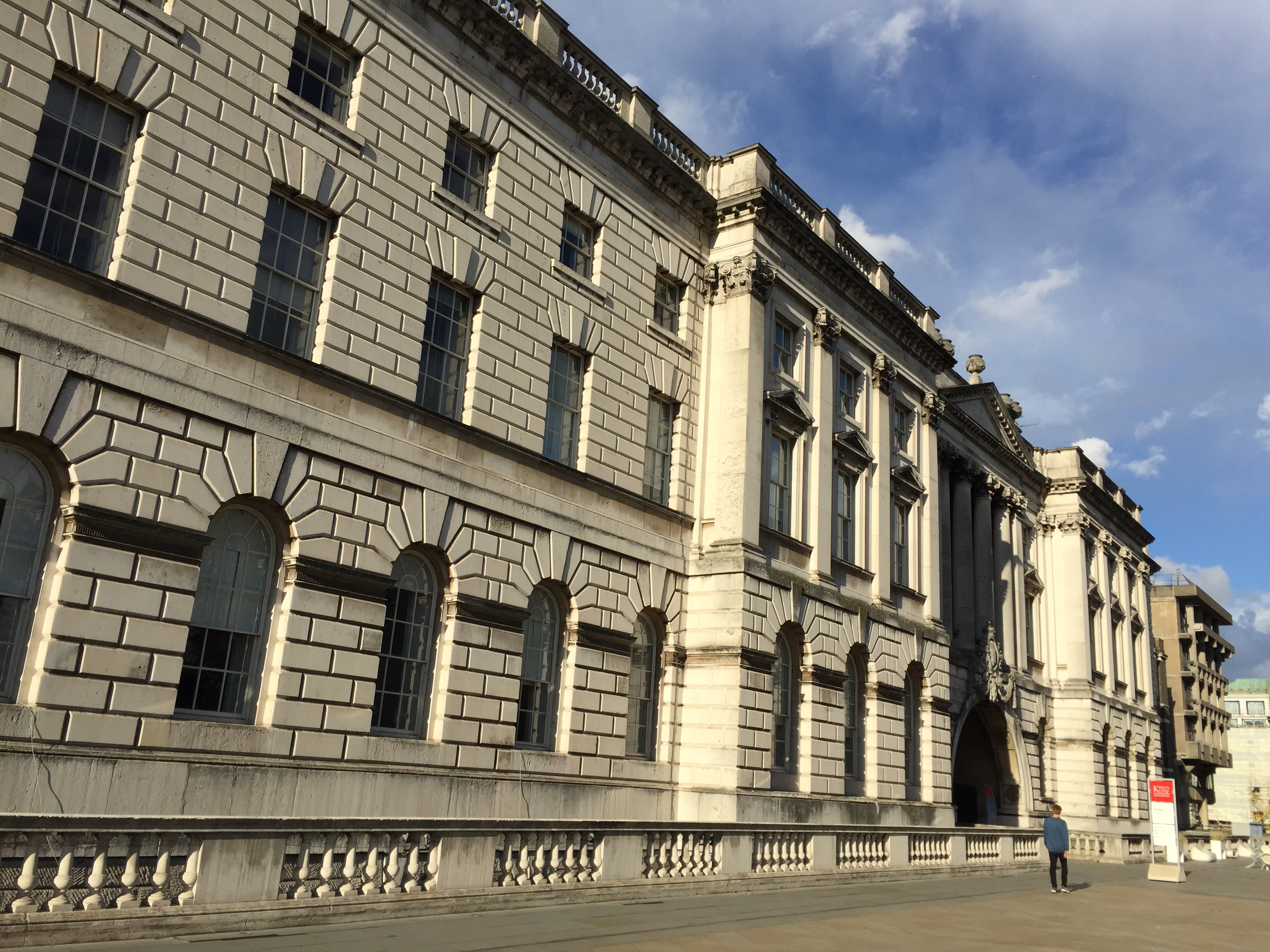
- Established: 1991
- Parent institution: King's College London
- Head of Department: Mark Hedges
- Location: Strand Campus, London, WC2B 5RL, London, UK
- Website: www.kcl.ac.uk/ddh
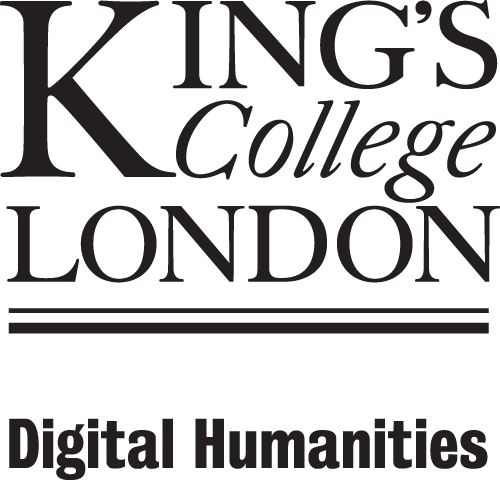

The Department of Digital Humanities (DDH) is an academic department and research centre in the Faculty of Arts & Humanities at King's College London. DDH counts amongst the "most visible" digital humanities centres worldwide. Its research activities cover themes such as digital cultures, past and present; technology, media and participation; data worlds; digital economy and society; and digital epistemology and methods.

The department was established by Professor Harold Short in 1991 as the Centre for Computing in the Humanities. It changed to its present name in 2011. The department researches digital culture and society, and explores the use of advanced technology-related methods in arts and humanities research. It was ranked first in the UK in the latest Research Excellence Framework in its category 'Communication, Cultural and Media Studies, Library and Information Management'.

The department runs a Bachelor's degree in Digital Culture which looks at how technological innovations are bringing about new challenges and opportunities in our societies. It also offers the level of a master's degree including in Digital Humanities, Digital Culture and Society, Digital Asset & Media Management, and Big Data in Culture & Society, as well as a PhD research degree in Digital Humanities. Mark Hedges is Head of Department and among its academics are Kate Devlin, Nick Srnicek, and Mercedes Bunz.

== See also ==
- King's College London
- Digital Classicist
- Digital Humanities
- Humanistic informatics
- Humanist (electronic seminar)
