= St Keverne =

Village in Cornwall, England

Coordinates: 50.050°N 5.089°W

St Keverne: Cornish: Lannaghevran
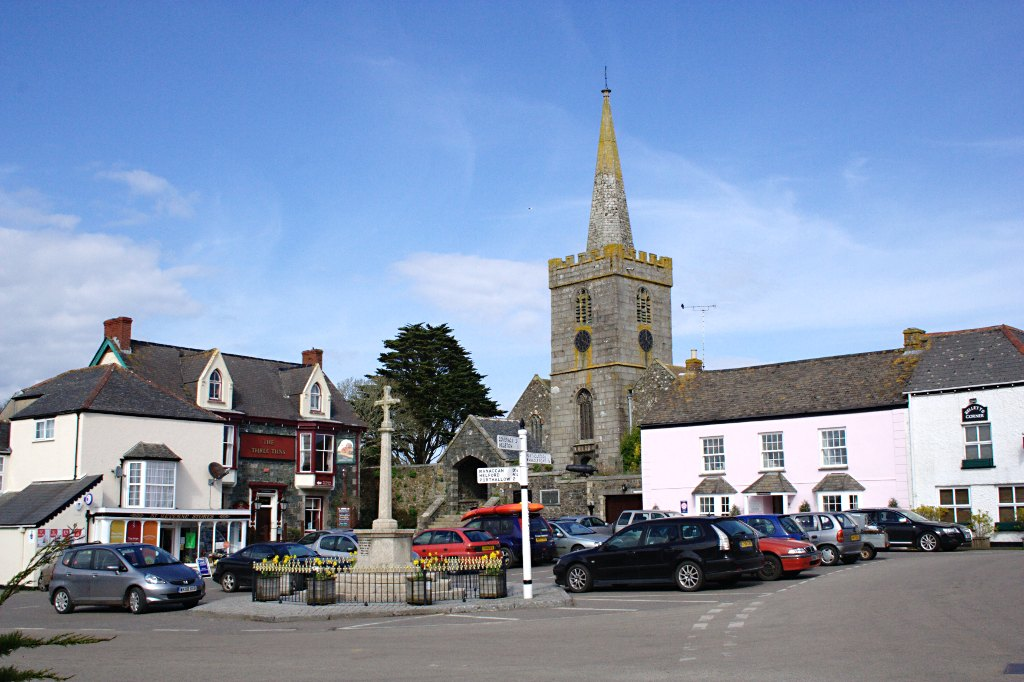
- St Keverne village square

- Location within Cornwall
- Population: 2,147 (Civil Parish, 2011)
- OS grid reference: SW789212
- Civil parish: St Keverne
- Unitary authority: Cornwall
- Ceremonial county: Cornwall
- Region: South West
- Country: England
- Sovereign state: United Kingdom
- Post town: Helston
- Postcode district: TR12
- Dialling code: 01326
- Police: Devon and Cornwall
- Fire: Cornwall
- Ambulance: South Western
- UK Parliament: St Ives

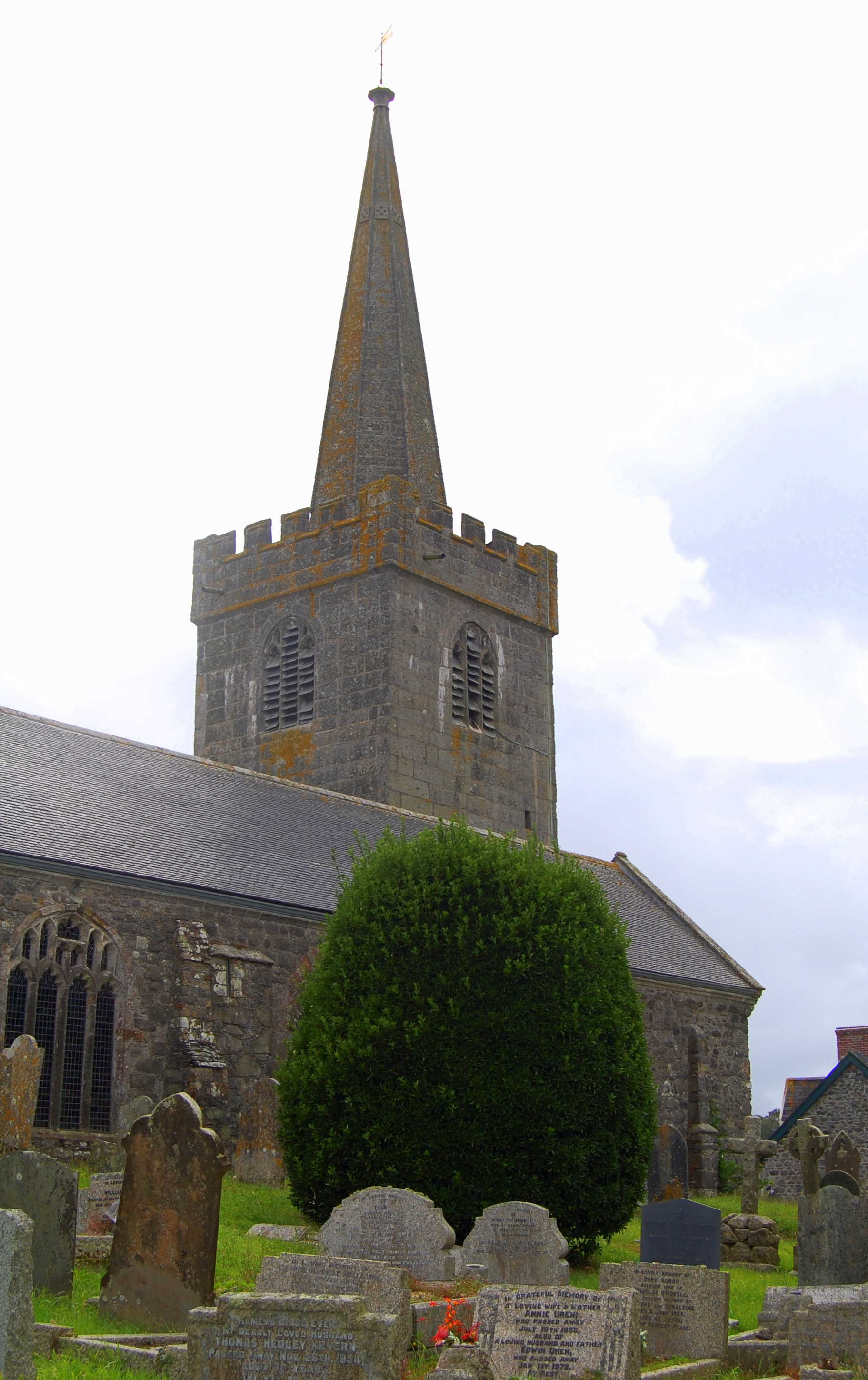
St Keverne parish church

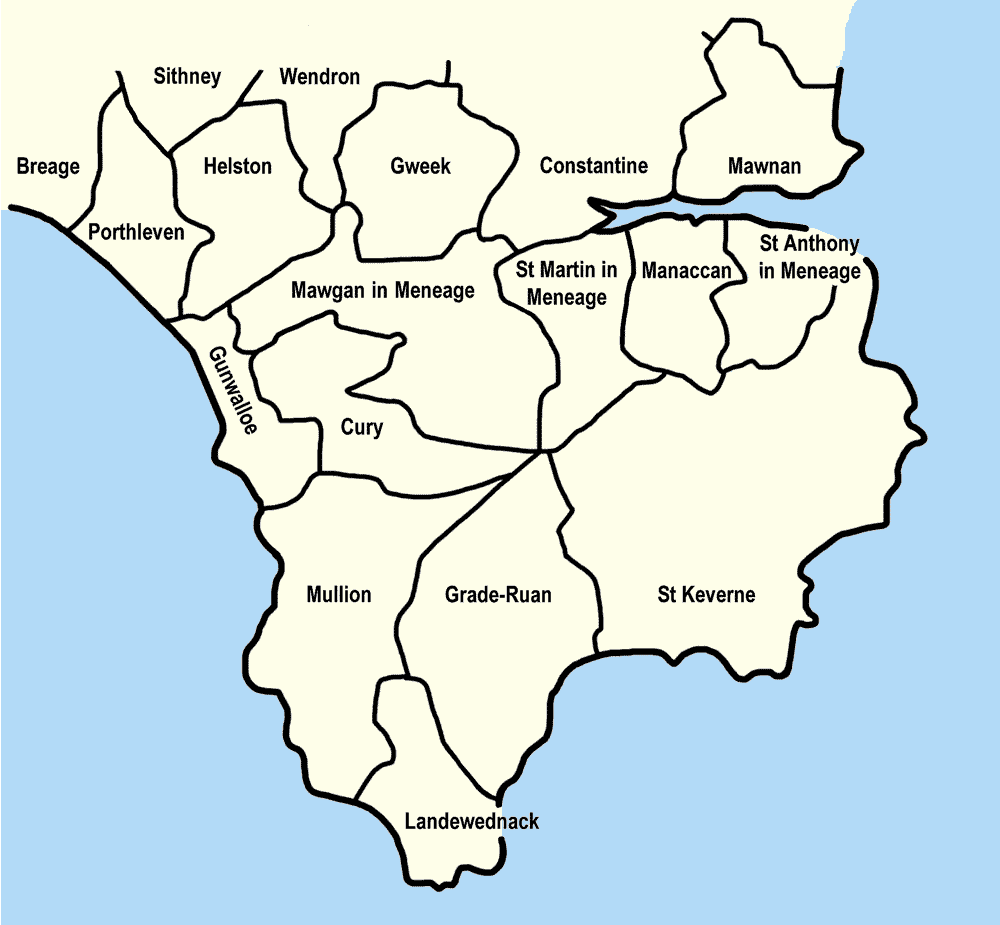
St Keverne in relation to neighbouring parishes

St Keverne (Cornish: Pluw Aghevran (parish), Lannaghevran (village)) is a civil parish and village on The Lizard in Cornwall, England, United Kingdom.

In addition to the parish, an electoral ward exists called St Keverne and Meneage. This stretches to the western Lizard coast at Gunwalloe. The population of the ward at the 2011 election was 5,220.

The Cornish rebellion of 1497 started in St Keverne. The leader of the rebellion Michael An Gof ("the smith" in Cornish) was a blacksmith from St Keverne and is commemorated by a statue in the village. Before his execution, An Gof said that he should have "a name perpetual and a fame permanent and immortal". In 1997 a 500th anniversary march, "Keskerdh Kernow 500", celebrating the rebellion, retraced the route of the original march from St Keverne, via Guildford to London.

== Geography ==
The parish is a large one. It includes some 10 miles of coast from Nare Point at the mouth of the Helford River to Kennack Sands, and the Manacles offshore. Settlements on the coast include Porthallow, Porthoustock and Coverack. Inland the parish includes the hamlets of Zoar, Laddenvean, Traboe, Trelan and Gwenter. The eastern part of Goonhilly Downs is also in the parish.

St Keverne lies within the Cornwall Area of Outstanding Natural Beauty (AONB).

== Parish Church of St Akeveranus ==
St Keverne was, in the Middle Ages, the site of an important monastery. The church is dedicated to St Akeveranus, although for a considerable period this was corrupted to Kieran; the form Keverne was revived at the Reformation. (Note: Nothing certain is known of St Akeveranus whose name occurs in various forms in medieval records: "Achebranus" (1083), "Achebrann" (1086), "Akeveran" (1201), "Akevran" (1278); forms similar to Kieran do not occur before 1283. The name Lanhaverne at St Keverne churchtown is formed of "lan" and "Akeveran". A legend is told of St Just visiting St Keverne and stealing a chalice; as he fled Keverne threw three stones after him which landed near Germoe at a place known as Tremenheverne (i.e. the three stones of Keverne).)

The church is very large for a village church and in its present form is 15th-century: however parts of the stonework appear to have been reused from a previous church building. Unusually for Cornwall, the tower is topped by a spire. Other features of interest include the bench ends and a mural painting.

A 32-pounder carronade that divers recovered in 1978 from the wreck of HMS Primose stands by the lych-gate to the churchyard. Primrose was wrecked on The Manacles off The Lizard on 21 January 1809 with the loss of 125 lives and only one survivor, a drummer boy.

The peal of ten bells is one of the largest two peals in a Cornish parish church; until 2001 St Keverne had eight bells to which two more were then added (Carbis Bay already had a peal of ten).

== History and antiquities ==
St. Keverne has been inhabited for many thousands of years, and there is evidence of human habitation from at least the Mesolithic period, c. 5550 BC. The area is rich in archaeological history from a variety of different periods, including flints, pottery, cists, round houses, and cliff castles.

=== Prehistory ===
The Mesolithic
In 1967, A Mesolithic site known as Rock Mound was discovered at Poldowrian Site, which is situated near the Lankidden Cliff Castle. The Mesolithic site was dated between 5,550 and 5250 BC, from some hazelnut fragments. Flint tools were first discovered during attempts to plow the land for planting, and overall, nearly 48,000 flint tools were discovered.

Neolithic
During the Neolithic period and beyond, St. Keverne was one of the primary sources of clay for pottery. Gabbroic clay covers an area of approximately 7 square miles of the Lizard Peninsula, mainly in the area of St. Keverne Parish. The clay lies at a depth of 8 – 18 inches below the topsoil. In the late 1960s, Dr. D. Peacock examined numerous potsherds from around Cornwall, and came to the conclusion that they were all made from the same gabbroic clay from St. Keverne. Most of the Paleolithic pottery from around Cornwall has been found to be made of gabbroic clay, such as the sherds at the Neolithic site of Carn Brea at Redruth.

Beaker Pottery
St. Keverne has yielded an exceptional amount of Beaker pottery. The Beaker Mound at Poldowrian has yielded one of the finest caches of Beaker pottery in Cornwall.

Bronze Age
Goonhilly Downs contains over 65 Bronze Age barrows, as well as the "dry tree" standing stone. A Bronze Age standing stone exists at Tremenheere, which means "Standing Stone Farm" (Tre = place/farm, Menhir = standing stone) and there is another place of the same name in Ludgvan. Other antiquities are a cist called the Three Brothers of Grugith on Crowza Downs and a destroyed fogou at Polkernogo.

Iron Age
St. Keverne has a number of Iron Age sites, with two of the most dramatic being the cliff castles of Chynalls and Lankidden. All that is left in these sites are the faint markings of the ditches and banks that would have protected these castles, but during the Iron Age they would have provided a "prominent focus within a landscape quite densely populated by contemporary settlements or "rounds."" Another notable Iron Age artefact originating in St. Keverne is the elaborately engraved bronze mirror discovered in a cist grave, in 1833. This mirror was accompanied by two brooches, some beads, and two rings.

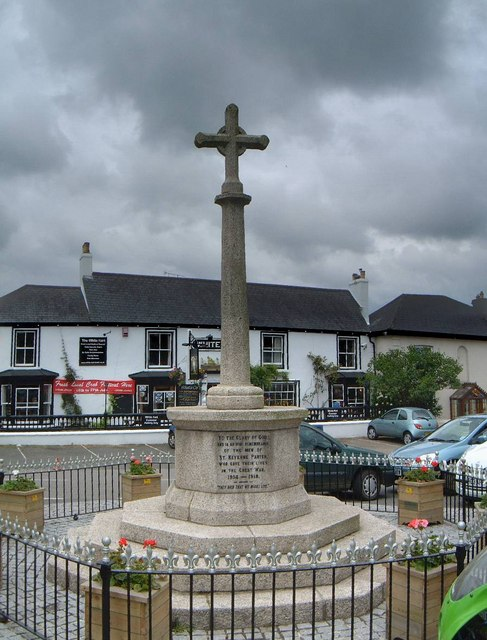
St Keverne war memorial

=== Middle Ages ===
In 967 AD King Edgar granted to Wulfnoth Rumuncant land in the Charter of Lesneague and Pennarth. Lesneague, together with Traboe, was later granted to the Benedictine monks of St Michael's Mount by Robert Count of Mortain.

St Keverne was in Celtic times part of the Meneage which belonged to several small monasteries. The monastery at St Keverne survived the Norman Conquest but was seized soon after by a lay lord. (According to the Geld Inquest of 1083 the canons of St Achebranus held one hide in the hundred of Winningtone (i.e. Kerrier) that never paid geld.)

The Condura and Tregarne manors in St Keverne parish were associated with Condura, the Cornish Earl of Cornwall at the time of the Norman Conquest, according to antiquary William Hals.

By 1236 the churches and demesnes of Tregonan had come into the possession of the Cistercian abbey at Beaulieu and their title was confirmed by Richard, Earl of Cornwall in 1258. This was a valuable possession including as it did the rectorial tithe of a large and prosperous parish, the tithe of fish, and the lands of the churchtown. The right of sanctuary held by Beaulieu Abbey was extended to St Keverne. A small cell of monks was maintained at Tregonan; slight remains of the building there existed until the early 20th century. In the parish is Lesneague which can be derived from Cornish lis (court) and manahec (monks' land) which would indicate that it was once the seat of a local chieftain.

== Cornish wrestling ==
There have been Cornish wrestling tournaments in St Keverne for prizes.

James Polkinghorne (1788–1851) was born at St Keverne and was one of the most famous champion Cornish wrestlers who had a number of famous contests against Devon fighters, including Flower, Jackman (1816) and Abraham Cann (1826), which drew very large crowds of spectators (c17,000).

Henry Cuttance (1807–?), from St Keverne, was a champion Cornish wrestler who was the initiator in rallying the local people to assist in the rescue of the crew of the Norwegian schooner, the Elizabeth of Bergen, when it ran aground in 1846.

== Notable residents ==
- Otto Tregonan (died 1439), politician, MP for Bodmin
- Michael An Gof (died 1497), blacksmith, leader of the first Cornish rebellion in 1497
- Charles Incledon (1763–1826), a Cornish tenor singer.
- George Nicholls (1781–1865), a British Poor Law Commissioner.
- James Polkinghorne (1788–1851), a champion Cornish wrestler

== See also ==
- Cornish self-government movement
- Cornish Rebellion of 1497
- Keskerdh Kernow 500
- Second Cornish Uprising of 1497
