= Comoere =

10th-century Bishop of Cornwall

- Bishop of Cornwall
- Appointed: 959 and 963
- Term ended: between 981 and a period between 988 and 990
- Predecessor: Daniel of Cornwall
- Successor: Ealdred

Orders
- Consecration: between 959 and 963

Personal details
- Died: between 981 and a period between 988 and 990
- Denomination: Christian

Comoere or Wulsige Comoere was a medieval Bishop of Cornwall.

Comoere was consecrated between 959 and 963. He died between 981 and a period between 988 and 990. The Bodmin Gospels record his manumission from slavery of a woman called Guenenguith and her son Morcefres.

== Citations ==
Christian titles
Preceded by Daniel of Cornwall	Bishop of Cornwall c. 961–c. 987	Succeeded by Ealdred
