= Leofric (bishop) =

11th-century Anglo-Saxon bishop of Exeter

- Bishop of Exeter
- Province: Canterbury
- Appointed: 1050
- Term ended: 1072
- Predecessor: Position Established
- Successor: Osbern FitzOsbern
- Previous posts: Bishop of Cornwall and of Crediton

Orders
- Consecration: 10 April 1046

Personal details
- Born: before 1016
- Died: 10 or 11 February 1072
- Buried: Exeter Cathedral crypt

Leofric (before 1016–1072) was a medieval Bishop of Exeter. Probably a native of Cornwall, he was educated on the continent. At the time Edward the Confessor was in exile before his succession to the English throne, Leofric joined his service and returned to England with him. After he became king, Edward rewarded Leofric with lands. Although a 12th-century source claims Leofric held the office of chancellor, modern historians agree he never did so.

Edward appointed Leofric as Bishop of Cornwall and Bishop of Crediton in 1046, but because Crediton was a small town, the new bishop secured papal permission to move the episcopal seat to Exeter in 1050. At Exeter, Leofric worked to increase the income and resources of his cathedral, both in lands and in ecclesiastical vestments. He was a bibliophile, and collected many manuscripts; some of these he gave to the cathedral library, including a famous manuscript of poetry, the Exeter Book. Leofric died in 1072; although his remains were moved to the new Exeter Cathedral which was built after his death, their location is no longer known and the current tomb does not mark his resting place.

== Early life ==
Little is known about Leofric, as his cathedral town was not a centre of historical writing, and he took little part in events outside his diocese. Little notice was taken of his life and activities; only a few charters originated in his household and there is only one listing of gifts to his diocese. No official acts from his episcopate have survived, and there is just a brief death notice in the Leofric Missal, although no notice of his death occurs in the contemporary Anglo-Saxon Chronicle. He occurs as a witness to royal charters.

Leofric was probably born in Cornwall, and his parents were English. Because canon law required that a bishop be 30 years old when consecrated, it is likely that Leofric was born before 1016. The medieval chronicler Florence of Worcester referred to him as a Brytonicus, which presumably meant that he was a native of Cornwall. He had a brother, Ordmaer, who acted as his steward and administered the family estates. Leofric was educated in Lotharingia, and may have been brought up abroad. Leofric may have gone into exile either in 1013 when Sweyn Forkbeard, the king of Denmark invaded England or in 1016, when Sweyn's son Cnut became king of England. His education possibly took place at the church of St Stephen's in Toul, where the future Pope Leo IX was a canon from 1017 to 1024 and bishop after 1027.

== Service to Edward the Confessor ==
Before Edward the Confessor became king of England, he was exiled to the continent. Leofric served as Edward's chaplain, although how or when exactly the two met is unknown. The historian Frank Barlow speculates that it may have been at Bruges in 1039. When Edward returned to England at the invitation of King Harthacnut, Edward's half-brother, Leofric accompanied him, witnessing charters during Harthacnut's lifetime along with Herman who later became Bishop of Sherborne. Leofric remained a close supporter and friend of Edward for the king's entire life. In 1044, Edward granted him lands at Dawlish in Devon.

Although a 12th-century monastic chronicler at Worcester called Leofric Edward's chancellor, this is not correct, as Edward had no chancellor at this time. Historians are divided on whether or not Edward ever had an official that could be called a chancellor, but they are agreed that Leofric did not hold such an office.

== Bishop ==
When Bishop Lyfing died in 1046, the king made Leofric Bishop of Cornwall as well as Bishop of Crediton. The two sees, or bishoprics, held by Lyfing became the see of Exeter in 1050 when Bishop Leofric moved his episcopal seat from Crediton to Exeter and combined it with Cornwall. The move of the see received the support of Pope Leo IX, and dates from 1051. Although Leofric had been a royal clerk before he became bishop, after his elevation he managed to avoid entanglement in the various disputes taking place between the king and Godwin, Earl of Wessex. Instead he spent his energies on the administration of his diocese, but remained on good terms with the king. Leofric's penitential, the Leofric Missal, still survives, and it includes a prayer for a childless king, which probably referred to King Edward.

The abbey church of St. Peter's at Exeter became Leofric's cathedral and he was enthroned as Bishop of Exeter there on St Peter's Day in 1050 with King Edward in attendance. The king and his wife Edith took part in the ceremony of enthronement, with both of them leading the bishop to his cathedra, or episcopal chair. Edith had dower rights to the town of Exeter, which may explain her presence at the ceremony.

Leofric replaced the monks with canons. The new community was given the Rule of Chrodegang by Leofric, which rule he had probably learned in Lotharingia before his return to England. Leofric moved the seat of his see because Crediton was too poor and rural, and Exeter was a city with protective walls and an abandoned church that could be used as the new cathedral. Leofric claimed that he found his diocese lacking in episcopal vestments and the other items required for church services, and his surviving list of gifts to the church noted that he gave vestments, crosses, chalices, censers, altar coverings, and other furnishings to the cathedral.

After the move to Exeter, Leofric worked to increase the endowment of the diocese, and especially the cathedral library, which he found almost empty upon his arrival. He later claimed that there were only five books owned by the cathedral chapter when he became bishop. He still remained on good terms with the king, for he was present at Edward's Christmas court in 1065 that saw the consecration of Edward's Westminster Abbey church at Westminster. No evidence survives that Leofric was employed by the king in any diplomatic missions, nor does Leofric appear to have attended any papal councils or synods. He was a supporter of the cult of Leo IX, who was proclaimed a saint after Leo's death.

== Death and legacy ==
Leofric survived William the Conqueror's 1068 siege of Exeter unscathed, although there is no evidence that he was present in the city during the siege. Whether Leofric had originally supported King Harold against William or if he supported William from the start is unclear. The fact that he survived William's purge of the native English bishops in 1070 is evidence that he must not have been too outspoken against William. Leofric remained bishop until he died on 10 February or 11 February 1072. He was buried in the crypt of his cathedral. When the cathedral was rebuilt, his remains were moved to the new church, but the location of the tomb has been lost. The current tomb only dates from 1568 and does not mark Leofric's resting place.

During Leofric's bishopric, his cathedral library was the fourth largest in England, and was an important scriptorium. He gave an important manuscript of Old English poetry, the Exeter Book, to the cathedral library in 1072. Contained in the Exeter Book are a number of poems showing of all the principal types of poems composed in Old English. This manuscript is one of four main sources for modern knowledge of Anglo-Saxon poetry. (Note: The other three are the Junius manuscript, the Nowell Codex, and the Vercelli Book.) Along with the Exeter Book, he also gave a number of other manuscripts and books to the cathedral upon his death. (Note: Some sources say he gave 59 manuscripts in total, other sources say that he gave "no fewer than sixty-six".) Three versions of the donation list drawn up by Leofric survive, which is one of the earliest surviving cathedral library catalogues. The list consists of 31 books used to conduct cathedral services, 24 other ecclesiastical works, and 11 works that were secular. This last group included philosophical works as well as poetry. The number of manuscripts that he owned and bequeathed to his cathedral was quite large for his time. Besides the Exeter Book and the Leofric Missal, Leofric's own copy of the Rule of Chrodegang also survives, although it is no longer at Exeter. Now it is at Cambridge University, where it is Corpus Christi College MS 191. Another surviving manuscript from Leofric's collection is a Gospel book written in Latin now in the Bodleian Library, which was probably acquired by Leofric while he was on the continent, as the manuscript was originally written for a Breton monastery. In all, about 20 of the manuscripts gifted by Leofric can be identified and are still extant, and only two remain at Exeter – including the Exeter Book. (Note: The rest of the manuscripts are at Cambridge University Library, Trinity College, Cambridge, Lambeth Palace, Bodleian Library at Oxford University, Corpus Christi College, Cambridge, and the British Library.)

The notice in his cathedral's records, which recorded his death, stated that Leofric was active in his diocese as a preacher, that he built many churches in his bishopric, and was noted as a teacher of his clergy. The historian Frank Barlow describes Leofric as "an able administrator and a progressive force" and one who "exemplifies the foreign prelate at his best".

== Citations ==
Catholic Church titles
Preceded by Lyfing of Winchester	Bishop of Cornwall and of Crediton; 1046–1050	Sees united and translated to Exeter
New title See united and translated from Cornwall and Crediton	Bishop of Exeter; 1050–1072	Succeeded by Osbern FitzOsbern
