= Bishop of Cornwall =

Episcopal title

The Bishop of Cornwall was the bishop of a diocese which existed between about 930 and 1050. Nothing is known about bishops in the post-Roman British Kingdom of Cornwall, but by the mid-ninth century Wessex was gaining control over the area, and between 833 and 870 a bishop at Dinuurrin, probably Bodmin, acknowledged the authority of the Archbishop of Canterbury. There may have been another bishop at St Germans. By the end of the century Cornwall was part of the diocese of Sherborne, and Asser may have been appointed the suffragan bishop of Devon and Cornwall around 890 before he became bishop of the whole diocese. When he died in 909, Sherborne was divided into three dioceses, of which Devon and Cornwall were one. In Æthelstan's reign (924–939) there was a further division with the establishment of a separate Cornish diocese based at St Germans. Later bishops of Cornwall were sometimes referred to as the bishops of St Germans. In 1050, the bishoprics of Crediton and of Cornwall were merged to form the diocese of Exeter. The Diocese of Truro (established 1876) now covers Cornwall, the Isles of Scilly and a small part of Devon.

== List of bishops of Cornwall ==
- Abbreviation: bet. = between; all the dates are very uncertain.

Bishops of Cornwall
From	Until	Incumbent	Notes
between 833 and 870	before 893	Kenstec	Bishop "in the Cornish race in the monastery which in the language of the British is called Dinuurrin"
between July 924 and 931	bet. 946 or 953 and November 955	Conan	
955 or 956	between 959 and 963	Daniel	
between 959 and 963	between 981 and 990	Wulfsige Comoere	
between 981 and 990	between 1002 and 1009	Ealdred	
between 1002 and 1009	1011 or 1012	? Æthelsige	
1011 or 1012	between 1019 and 1027	Buruhwold	
1027	20, 23 or 25 March 1046	Lyfing	Also Bishop of Crediton and Bishop of Worcester
1046, possibly consecrated 19 April	1050	Leofric	Also Bishop of Crediton
In 1050, Leofric transferred the united sees of Crediton and of Cornwall to Exeter.
