= Ealdred (bishop of Cornwall) =

10th and 11th-century Bishop of Cornwall

- Bishop of Cornwall
- In office: between 981 and a period between 988 and 990
- Predecessor: Comoere
- Successor: Æthelred of Cornwall

Orders
- Consecration: between 981 and a period between 988 and 990

Personal details
- Died: between 1002 and 1009
- Denomination: Christian

Ealdred was a medieval Bishop of Cornwall. He was consecrated between 981 and a period between 988 and 990. He died between 1002 and 1009.

In 994, King Æthelred of England removed the diocese of Cornwall from the supervision of the bishop of Crediton. The diploma granting the liberty of the diocese declares that it was written by Sigeric, archbishop of Canterbury, although it is unlikely that it was actually written by his own hand.

== Citations ==
Christian titles
Preceded by Comoere	Bishop of Cornwall c. 987–c. 1006	Succeeded by Æthelred of Cornwall
