= H. P. R. Finberg =

English historian, typographer and publisher

Herbert Patrick Reginald Finberg (1900–1974) was an English historian, typographer and publisher. After working at several publishing companies and founding his own (Alcuin Press), he joined the faculty of Leicester University in 1952. He became head of the Department of English Local History, which was recognised as the only centre for postgraduate studies in the subject. He edited the journal Agricultural History Review and three volumes of early Anglo-Saxon charters, Early Charters of Devon and Cornwall (1953), Early Charters of the West Midlands (1961) and Early Charters of Wessex (1964). He also edited Scandinavian England. Collected Papers by F. T. Wainwright. Other works included Tavistock Abbey (1949), The Formation of England (1974) and Manual of Catholic Prayer (1962).

== Early life and education ==
Herbert Finberg was born in Rickmansworth, Hertfordshire on 21 March 1900. His father was the art historian Alexander Finberg. He was educated at Oxford University, where he was awarded a third class degree in Lit Hum.

== Career as typographer and publisher ==
In the inter-war period Finberg worked as a typographer and publisher. He worked for the Shakespeare Head Press and then set-up his own company the Alcuin Press. The Alcuin Press went out of business in the late 1930s and Finberg went to work at the Broadwater Press and then, in 1944, at the firm of Burnes Oates and Washbourne. In the late 1940s and 1950s he was also an advisor to His Majesty's Stationery Office on publications such as the order of service for Queen Elizabeth II's coronation.
