= Della Hooke =

Geographer in the United Kingdom

Della Hooke, FSA (born 1939) is a British historical geographer and academic, who specialises in landscape history and Anglo Saxon England.

On 5 May 1990, she was elected a Fellow of the Society of Antiquaries of London (FSA).

== Selected publications ==
- Trees in Anglo-Saxon England: Literature, Lore and Landscape
- The Anglo-Saxon Landscape: The Kingdom of the Hwicce
- The Landscape of Anglo-Saxon England
- England's Landscape: The West Midlands
- Pre Conquest Charter Bounds Of Devon And Cornwall
- Anglo Saxon Wolverhampton: The Town And Its Monastery
- Worcestershire Anglo Saxon Charter Bounds
- Warwickshire Anglo Saxon Charter Bounds
