= Codex Diplomaticus Aevi Saxonici =

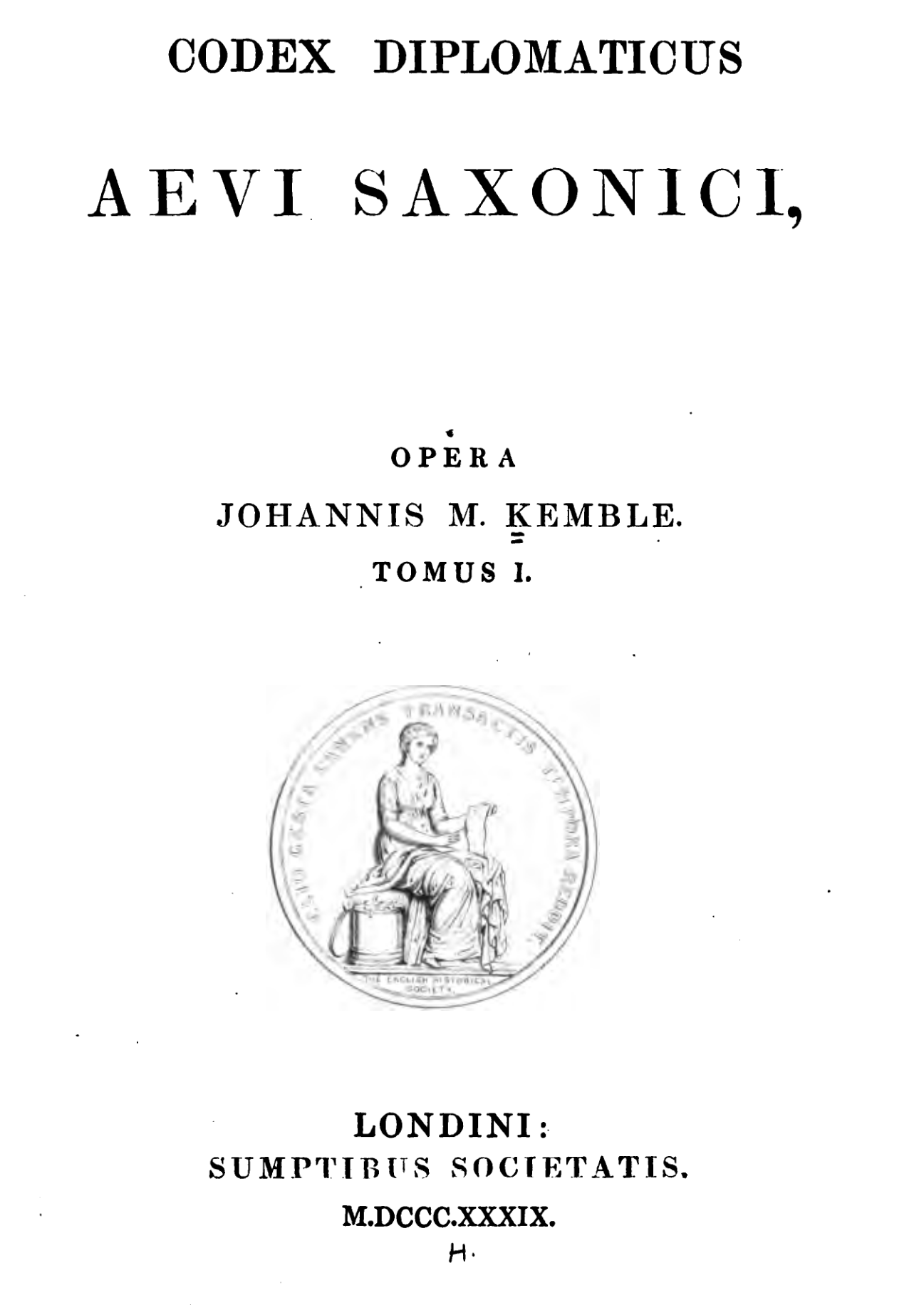
- Frontispiece of the first book (1839).
- Author: John Mitchell Kemble
- Discipline: Anglo-Saxon charters
- Publisher: Sumptibus Societatis
- Published: 1885 (Vol.1), 1887 (Vol.2), 1893 (Vol.3)
- No. of books: 3

The Codex Diplomaticus Aevi Saxonici ('Diplomatic Code of the Saxon Age') was a collection of documents from the Anglo-Saxon period preserved in manuscripts held by various libraries in England assembled by John Mitchel Kemble. Published in six volumes between 1839 and 1848, it was the first collected edition of the surviving corpus of Anglo-Saxon charters.

It formed the basis for later works such as the Cartularium Saxonicum and Sawyer's "Anglo-Saxon Charters: an Annotated List and Bibliography".

== Background and Scope ==
Kemble conceived of the work whilst a law student at Trinity College, Cambridge, it being intended as an essentially a case study in legal history. He explained:

"Too much ignorance prevails in England respecting the habits of our Saxon ancestors; too many of our most polished scholars have condescended to make themselves the echoes of degenerate Greeks and enervated Romans"

The original series was only intended to be four volumes covering the years AD 640–1066.

Volume	Publication Date	Charter Dates	Number of Charters
1	1839	640-838	240
2	1840	838-966	287
3	1845	966-1016	199
4	1846	1016-1066	225

However following the discovery of the Codex Wintoniensis, Kemble published a 5th volume in 1847 of some further 236 documents covering the years 616 to 958. The 6th and final volume followed on from the 5th, covering the years 959 to 1066; some 157 documents. Therefore, the total number of documents published in the series numbered 1369.

== Criticism ==
Some four decades after Kemble published Codex Diplomaticus series, Birch revisited the subject with his own series on Anglo Saxon Charters, the Cartularium Saxonicum. Of Kemble's work he acknowledges: "the justly celebrated Codex Diplomaticus (1839-1848) of the late Mr. J. M. Kemble occupies a position in literature achieved by no other collection of historical evidence in the world", however then states, regarding the accuracy of the work: "texts themselves are in a large proportion of cases edited incorrectly, and that, in some instances, to a serious extent."

== Bibliography ==
The complete was series was scanned by Google from copies in the Toronto and Oxford university libraries and are made available via Archive.org:

- Kemble, John Mitchell (1839). Codex diplomaticus aevi saxonici. Vol. 1. London: Sumptibus Societatis. Covers numbers 1–240.
- Kemble, John Mitchell (1840). Codex diplomaticus aevi saxonici. Vol. 2. London: Sumptibus Societatis. Covers numbers 241–527.
- Kemble, John Mitchell (1845). Codex diplomaticus aevi saxonici. Vol. 3. London: Sumptibus Societatis. Covers numbers 528–726.
- Kemble, John Mitchell (1846). Codex diplomaticus aevi saxonici. Vol. 4. London: Sumptibus Societatis. Covers numbers 727-981.
- Kemble, John Mitchell (1847). Codex diplomaticus aevi saxonici. Vol. 5. London: Sumptibus Societatis. Covers numbers 982–1217.
- Kemble, John Mitchell (1848). Codex diplomaticus aevi saxonici. Vol. 6. London: Sumptibus Societatis. Covers numbers 1218–1369.

== See also ==
- Anglo-Saxon Charters: an Annotated List and Bibliography
- List of Anglo-Saxon Charters
