= Wendt =

Wendt is a German surname. Notable people with the surname include:

- Albert Wendt (born 1939), Samoan poet in New Zealand
- Alexander Wendt (born 1958), American political scientist
- Amadeus Wendt (1783–1836), German philosopher and music theorist
- André Wendt (born 1971), German politician
- Benny Wendt (born 1950), Swedish footballer
- Bill Wendt (1915–1966), American basketball coach and professional player
- Botho Wendt August Graf zu Eulenburg (1831–1911), Prussian politician
- Carl von Wendt (born 1953), Swedish curler
- Dean Wendt (born 1968), American voice actor
- E. Allan Wendt (born 1935), first US Ambassador to Slovenia
- François Willi Wendt (1909–1970), French painter
- Friedrich von Wendt (1738–1808), German physician
- Georg Wendt (1889–1948), German politician
- George Wendt (1948–2025), American actor
- Guenter Wendt (1923–2010), German-American engineer
- Hans Hinrich Wendt (1853–1928), German Protestant theologian
- Henry Lorensz Wendt (1858–1911), Sri Lankan Burgher lawyer, judge, and legislator
- J. M. Wendt (1830–1917), South Australian jeweller
- Jana Wendt (born 1956), Australian TV journalist
- Joja Wendt (born 1964), jazz musician
- Karolina Wendt (1822–1848), Polish ballet dancer
- Lionel Wendt (1900–1944), Sri Lankan pianist, photographer and critic
- Marian Wendt (born 1985), German politician
- Martin Wendt (active in 2000s), Danish professional poker player
- Mats Wendt (born 1965), Classical composer
- Oscar Wendt (born 1985), Swedish footballer
- Roger Wendt (1933–2011), Iowan politician and legislator
- Viola S. Wendt (1907–1986), American poet
- Wilhelmina Wendt (1896–1988), Swedish silversmith
- William Wendt (1865–1946), German-American landscape painter

== See also ==
- Wend (disambiguation)
- Wendt & Kühn, a German manufacturer of wooden figures and music boxes
