= Anglo-Saxon Charters: an Annotated List and Bibliography =

1968 work by Peter H. Sawyer

Anglo Saxon Charters: an Annotated List and Bibliography
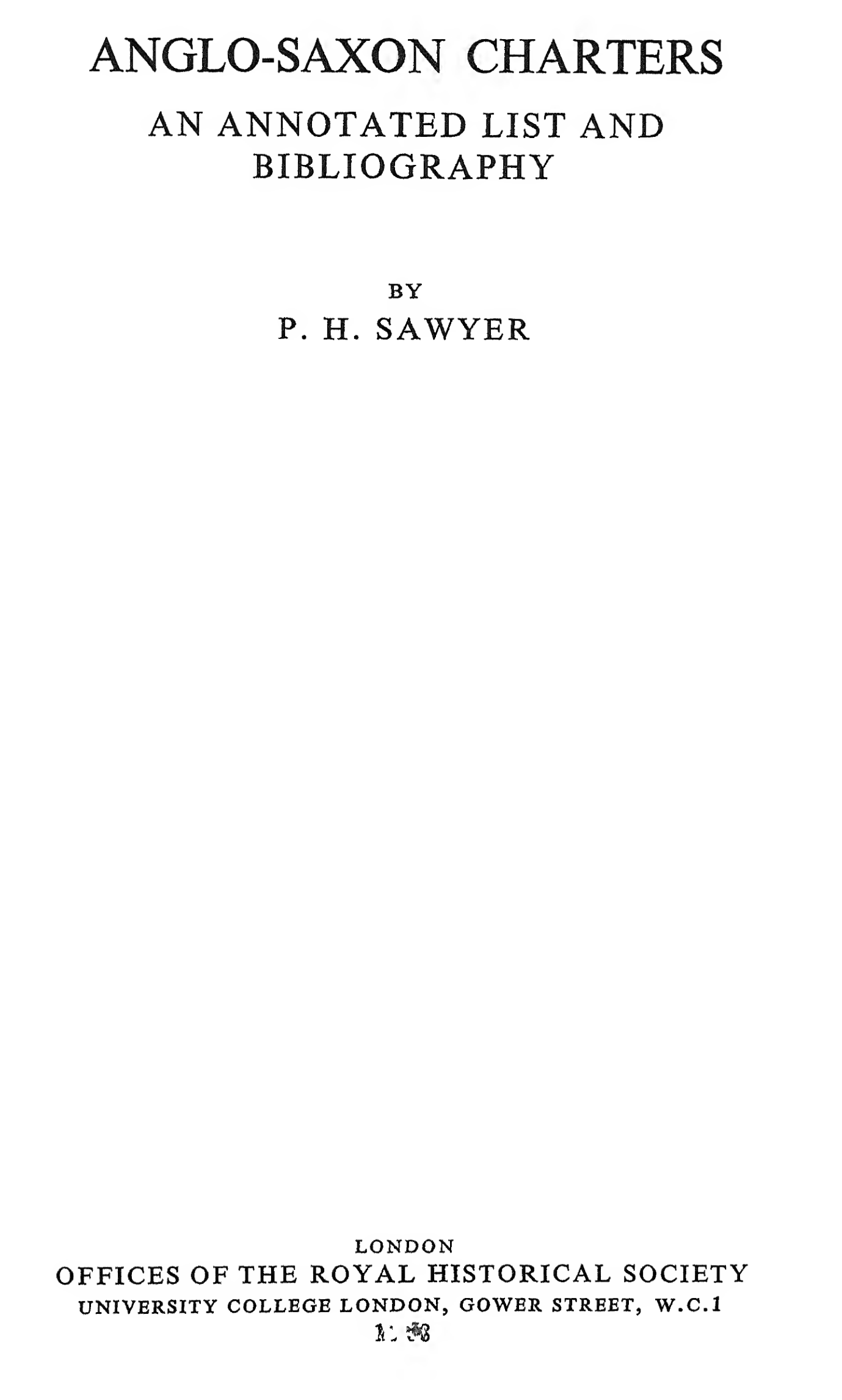
- Author: Peter H. Sawyer
- Publisher: Royal Historical Society
- Publication date: 1968
- Pages: 562
- Website: https://esawyer.lib.cam.ac.uk/about/index.html

Anglo-Saxon Charters: an Annotated List and Bibliography by Peter Sawyer is a list of all known Anglo-Saxon Charters. It was published in 1968 by the Royal Historical Society as volume 8 of their Guides and Handbooks series. It is considered a standard work in the study of Anglo-Saxon England and today most Anglo-Saxon Charters are referred to by their 'Sawyer number', taken from the publication.

== Background and scope ==
Sawyer's work built on what was originally started by Kemble's Codex Diplomaticus Aevi Saxonici expanded by Birch's Cartularium Saxonicum. The scope was to list all "the charters granting land or secular rights over land that purport to have been issued in England before the Norman Conquest". Sawyer's use of the term 'charter' was meant in the broadest sense, including a wide variety of texts including writs, wills, records of disputes and miscellaneous memoranda, as well as landbooks and leases.

In total, some 1875 documents appear in the published list, compared to 1369 in the Codex Diplomaticus and 1354 in the Cartularium Saxonicum. For each charter there is a brief description of its content, a list of the surviving manuscripts (up to the year 1800), an estimate of the date of their scripts, references to all printed editions, translations and facsimiles, and a bibliography of all significant discussions of the charter, together with a brief indication of the gist of the views of most of the cited authors.

Sawyer's Annotated List is currently kept up to date as an active website project: The Electronic Sawyer. It has revised and expanded the scope of the original work, including updating its bibliography to works published post-1968.

== Content ==
Sawyer's work is mainly organized chronologically and subdivided by reigning monarch. The first 1163 are royal writs and diplomas, followed by non-royal charter by the laity, bishops and other ecclesiastics; and finally by miscellaneous texts, wills and boundary descriptions.

Royal diplomas and writs
| S 1–41 | Kings of Kent |
| S 42–50 | Kings of Sussex |
| S 51–63 | Rulers of the Hwicce |
| S 64–65 | Kings of Essex |
| S 66 | King of Northumbria |
| S 67–226 | Rulers of Mercia (to Æthelflæd) |
| S 227–357 | Kings of Wessex (to Alfred) |
| S 358–385 | Edward the Elder (899–924) |
| S 386–458 | Æthelstan (924–39) |
| S 459–515 | Edmund (939–46) |
| S 516–580 | Eadred (946–55) |
| S 581–666 | Eadwig (955–9) |
| S 667–827 | Edgar (959–75) |
| S 828–832 | Edward the Martyr (975–8) |
| S 833–946 | Æthelred II (978–1016) [S 945–6 are writs] |
| S 947–948 | Edmund Ironside (1016) |
| S 949–992 | Cnut (1016–35) [S 985–92 are writs] |
| S 993–997 | Harthacnut (1035–7, 1040–2) [S 996–7 are writs] |
| S 998–1162 | Edward the Confessor (1042–1066) [S 1063–1162 are writs] |
| S 1163 | Harold (1066) [a writ] |
Non-royal (private) charters
| S 1164–1243 | Grants by the laity |
| S 1244–1409 | Grants by bishops |
| S 1410–1428 | Grants by other ecclesiastics |
| S 1429–1481 | Miscellaneous texts (memoranda, records of disputes, etc.) |
Wills and bequests
| S 1482–1539 | |
Boundary clauses
| S 1540–1602 | |
Lost and incomplete texts
| S 1603–1875 | |

== Reception ==
Sawyer's Annotated List has become a standard work in the study of Anglo-Saxon Charters, with most modern works referring to charters by their 'Sawyer number'. Nicholas Brooks described it as "an invaluable work of reference" in 1974, stating:

"Properly used as a guide to the original sources and to the secondary literature, and not as an alternative to them, the Bibliography saves many hours of misguided searching in libraries and is a constant stimulus to effective research."

French archivist and historian, Claude Fagnen, described the listing of 1875 documents as "simply remarkable" but criticized its lack of scope, print formatting and difficult concordance tables; ultimately praising it as a "magnifique apport".

== The Electronic Sawyer ==
This Electronic Sawyer project has digitized Sawyer's original Annotated List, which can be searched used using Sawyer, Birch or Kemble numbers. It includes the texts of the charters and translations into English where available. It also includes corrections, charters discovered since Sawyer's original publication in 1968, and citation of references to each charter in academic publications. The references have not been updated since the early 2000s. The project was published online in 1999 and revised in 2010.

== Bibliography ==
- Sawyer, Peter (1968). Anglo-Saxon Charters: an annotated list and bibliography. London: Royal Historical Society.

== See also ==
- Cartularium Saxonicum
- Codex Diplomaticus Aevi Saxonici
- List of Anglo-Saxon Charters
