= Cartularium Saxonicum =

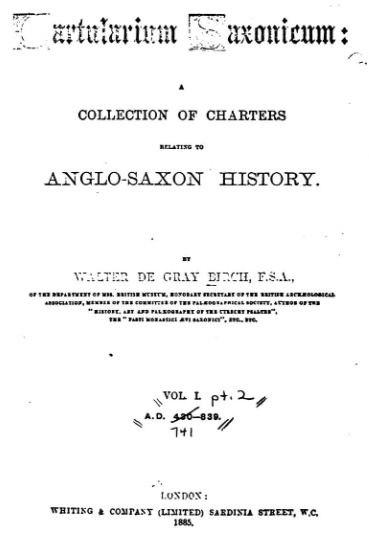
- Frontispiece of the first volume.
- Author: Walter de Gray Birch
- Discipline: Anglo-Saxon Charters
- Publisher: Whiting and Company
- Published: 1885 (vol.1), 1887 (vol.2), 1893 (vol.3), 1899 (index)
- No. of books: 3 (+index)

Cartularium Saxonicum ('Saxon Charters') is a three-volume collection of Anglo-Saxon charters published from 1885 to 1893 by Walter de Gray Birch, then working in the Department of Manuscripts at the British Library. It built on the work of the earlier Codex Diplomaticus Aevi Saxonici, expanding its scope.

== Background and Scope ==
Birch conceived of the work as an update to Kemble's Codex Diplomaticus Aevi Saxonici some four decades earlier. He explains:

"... the remarkable anomaly became very prominently fixed before my mind that, while the justly celebrated Codex Diplomaticus (1839-1848) of the late Mr. J. M. Kemble occupies a position in literature achieved by no other collection of historical evidence in the world, the texts themselves are in a large proportion of cases edited incorrectly, and that, in some instances, to a serious extent."

Birch's work formed the basis of William George Searle's Onomasticon and, most recently, projects such as the Prosopography of Anglo-Saxon England.

Vol	Date Published	Charter Dates	Number of Charters	Charter Numbers
1	1885	430-839	427	1-427
2	1887	840-925	412	428-839
3	1893	925-959	512	840-1354

In total, Birch published 1354 charters covering the years 430-959 AD.

== Bibliography ==
All volumes were scanned by Google from the Harvard university library collection and made available via Archive.org:

- Birch, Walter de Gray (1885). Cartularium saxonicum: a collection of charters relating to Anglo-Saxon history: AD 430-738. Vol. 1 Pt.1. London: Whiting.
- Birch, Walter de Gray (1885). Cartularium saxonicum: a collection of charters relating to Anglo-Saxon history: AD 741-839. Vol. 1 Pt.2. London: Whiting.
- Birch, Walter de Gray (1887). Cartularium saxonicum: a collection of charters relating to Anglo-Saxon history: AD 840-928. Vol. 2 Pt.1. London: Whiting.
- Birch, Walter de Gray (1887). Cartularium saxonicum: a collection of charters relating to Anglo-Saxon history: AD 928-947. Vol. 2 Pt.2. London: Whiting.
- Birch, Walter de Gray (1893). Cartularium saxonicum: a collection of charters relating to Anglo-Saxon history: AD 948-959. Vol. 3. London: Whiting.
- Birch, Walter de Gray (1899). Inder Saxonicus: An Index to All the Names of Persons in the Cartularium Saxonicum. London: Phillimore & Company.

The most recent edition was released on May 24, 2012, by Cambridge University Press.

== See also ==
- Anglo-Saxon Charters: an Annotated List and Bibliography
- List of Anglo-Saxon Charters
