= Wend =

Wend may refer to:

- Wends, an ethnic group
- WEnd, the marker for the end of a while loop in some computer languages
- WEND, a modern rock radio station in Charlotte, North Carolina, United States

== People ==
- Chris Wend (born 1987), German sprint canoeist
- Rainer Wend (born 1954), German politician
- Wend von Wietersheim (1900–1975), German general

== See also ==
- Wend Valley
- Wendy
- Wendt
- Went (disambiguation)
- Vend (disambiguation)
- Vent (disambiguation)
- Vendt
