= Blue colour works =

Type of paintworks

A blue colour works (German: Blaufarbenwerke) is a paintworks where blue pigment for use in glassmaking is produced. Usually the pigment, cobalt blue, needed for this purpose, was manufactured from cobalt-containing ore as in the case of the factories listed below.

== Blue colour works ==
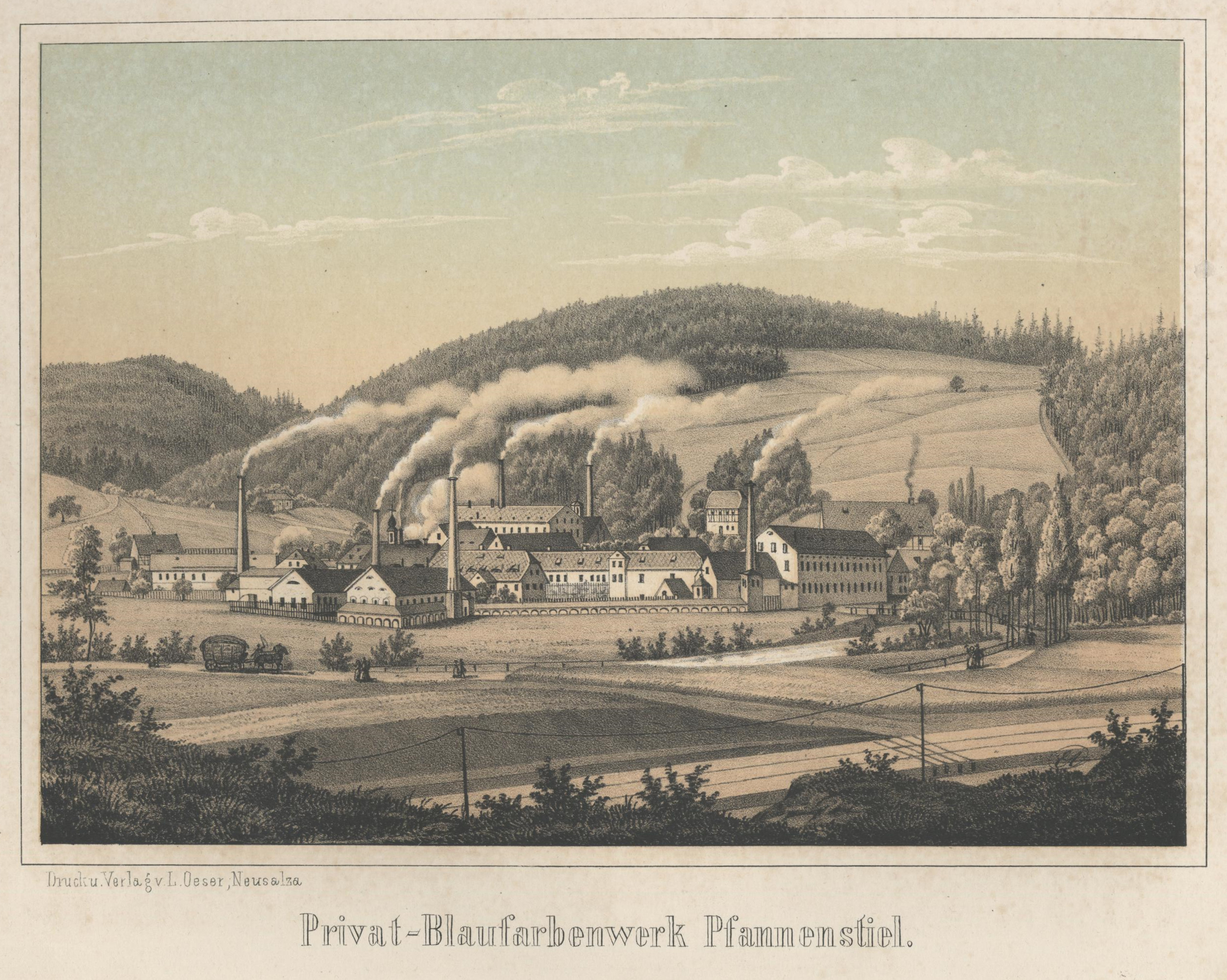
The Niederpfannenstiel Blue Colour Works in the mid-19th century

- Saxony
  - Oberschlema Blue Colour Works (Blaufarbenwerk Oberschlema) (founded 1644) in Oberschlema, according to some sources this was the largest blue colour works in the world
  - Schneeberg Blue Colour Works (Blaufarbenwerk Schneeberg) (1568 to around 1580) in Schneeberg, the first small blue colour works in Saxony
  - Unterjugel Blue Colour Works (Blaufarbenwerk Unterjugel), 17th century, in Unterjugel
  - Niederpfannenstiel Blue Colour Works (Blaufarbenwerk Niederpfannenstiel) (founded 1635) in Niederpfannenstiel
  - Schindler's Blue Colour Works (Schindlersches Blaufarbenwerk) (founded 1649) in Schindlerswerk
  - Oehmesches Blue Colour Works (1649–1688) (Oehmesches Blaufarbenwerk) in Annaberg
  - Zschopenthal Blue Colour Works (Zschopenthal Blaufarbenwerk) (1687–1847) in Zschopenthal
- Prussia
  - Hasserode Blue Colour Works (Blaufarbenwerk Hasserode) (to around 1850)
- Bohemia
  - Christophhammer Blue Colour Works (Blaufarbenwerk Christophhammer) (1750–1874) in Christophhammer
- Norway
  - Modum Blue Colour Works in Modum
  - Snarum Blue Colour Works in Snarum

== Literature ==
- Wilhelm Bruchmüller: Der Kobaltbergbau und die Blaufarbenwerke in Sachsen bis zum Jahre 1653. Crossen, 1897 (digitalised)
- Friedrich Kapf: Beyträge zur Geschichte des Kobolts, Koboltbergbaues und der Blaufarbenwerke. Breslau, 1792 (digitalised)
