= Went =

Went can mean:

== Surname ==
- Else Went, American playwright
- Frits Went (1863–1935), Dutch botanist who used the standard author abbreviation "Went"
- Frits Warmolt Went (1903–1990), Dutch biologist and child of Frits Went
- George Went Hensley (1881–1955), American Pentecostal minister and snake-handler
- Gwilym Went (1914–2005), Welsh cricketer
- Jamie Went (born 1982), English cricketer
- Johanna Went (born 1950), American performance artist
- John Went (born 1944), Anglican Bishop of Tewkesbury
- Joseph J. Went (born 1930), United States Marine Corps general
- Kingsley Went (born 1981), Zimbabwean cricketer
- Louise Went (1865–1951), Dutch pioneer in the field of public housing and social work
- Paul Went (1949–2017), English footballer

== Other uses ==
- Cholodny–Went model, a biological model of tropism devised by Frits Warmolt Went
- River Went, a river in Yorkshire, England
- WENT (1340 AM), a radio station in Gloversville, New York
- Went Mountains frog (Papurana grisea), an Indonesian frog
- Went (verb), the past tense of the verb go

== See also ==
- Wend (disambiguation)
- Wendt
- Wentz
