= Zschopenthal Blue Colour Works =

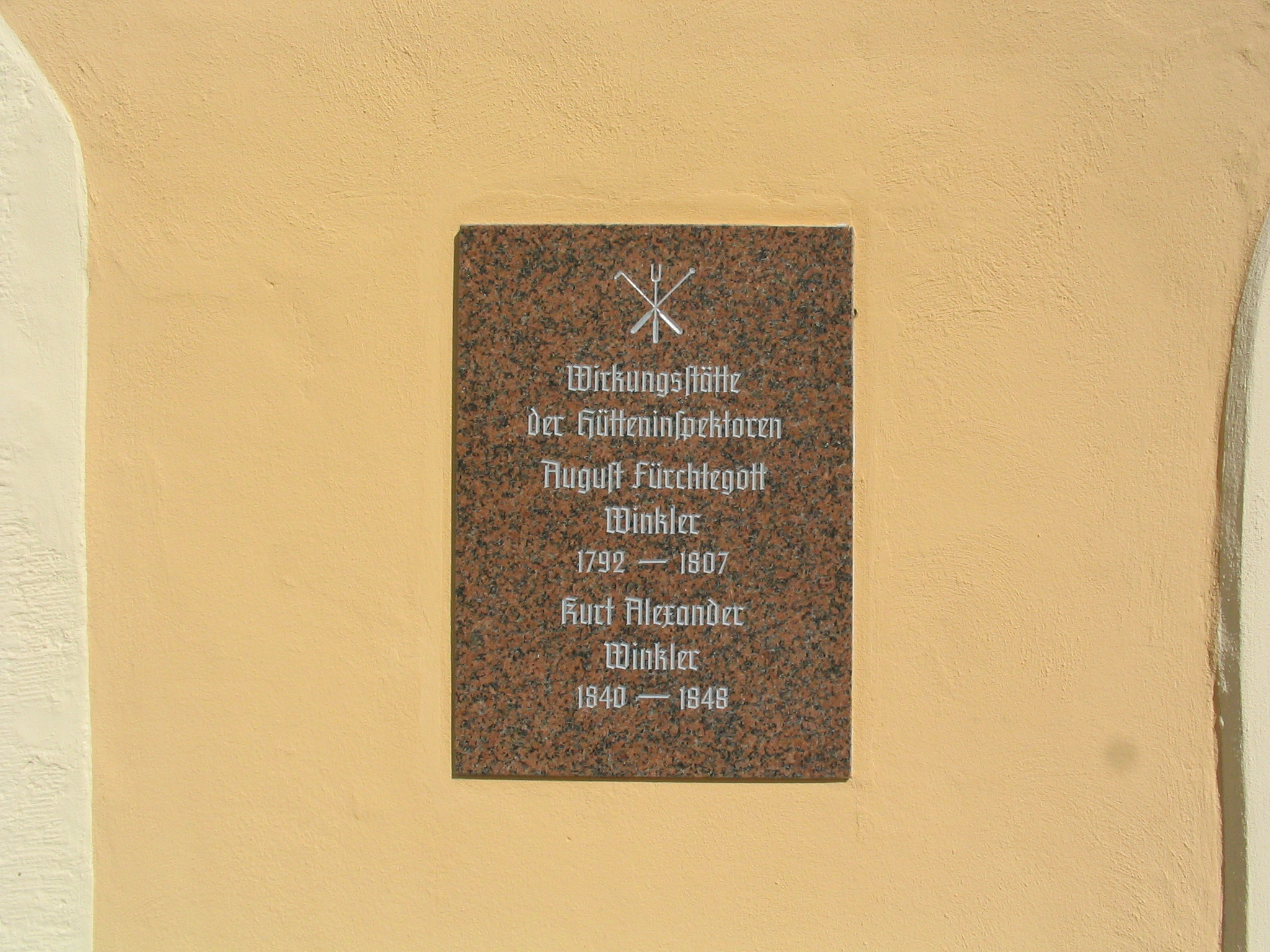
Memorial tablet for August Fürchtegott and Kurt Alexander Winkler on the tower house of the Zschopenthal Blue Colour Works

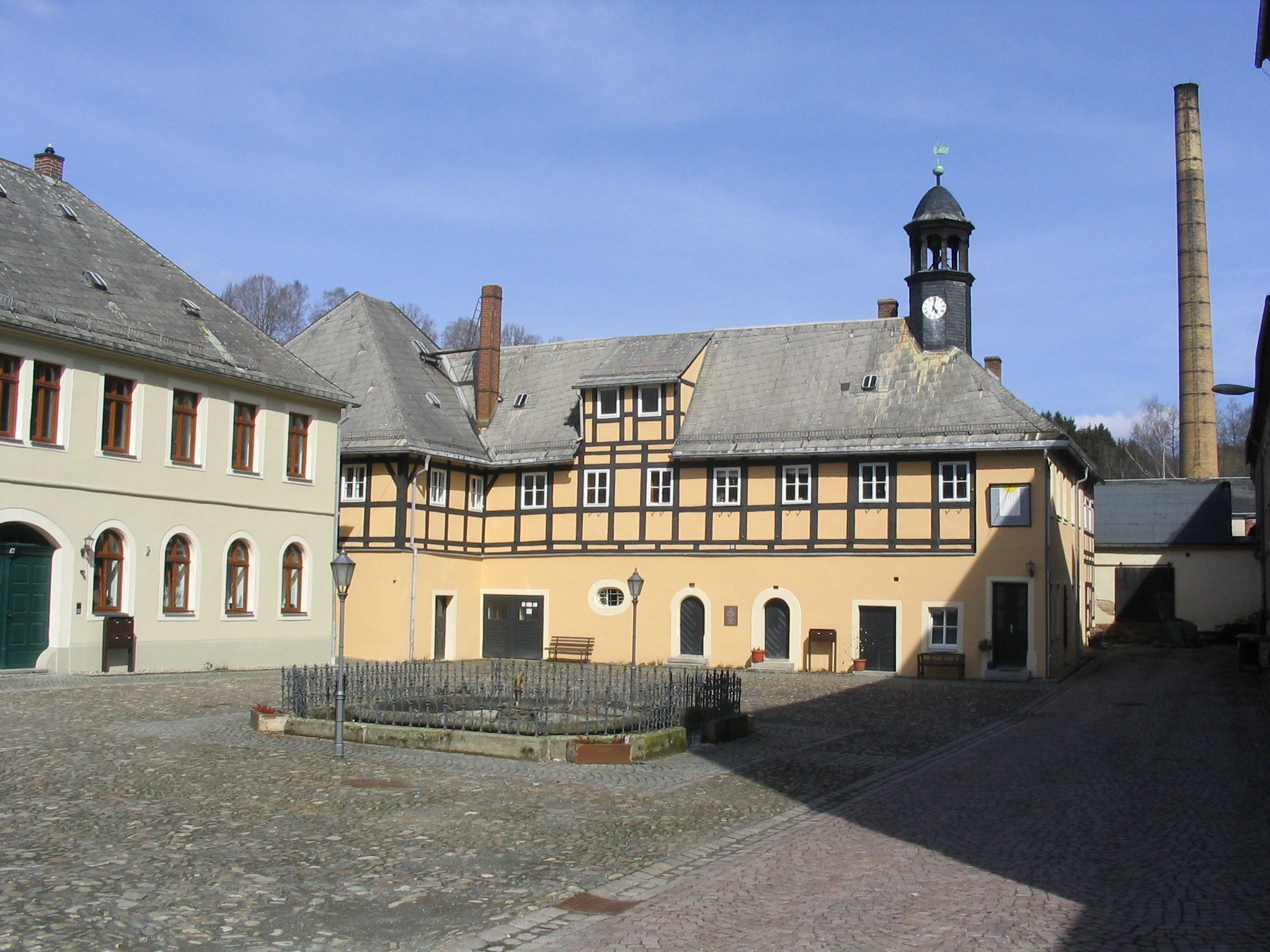
The Zschopenthal Blue Colour Works

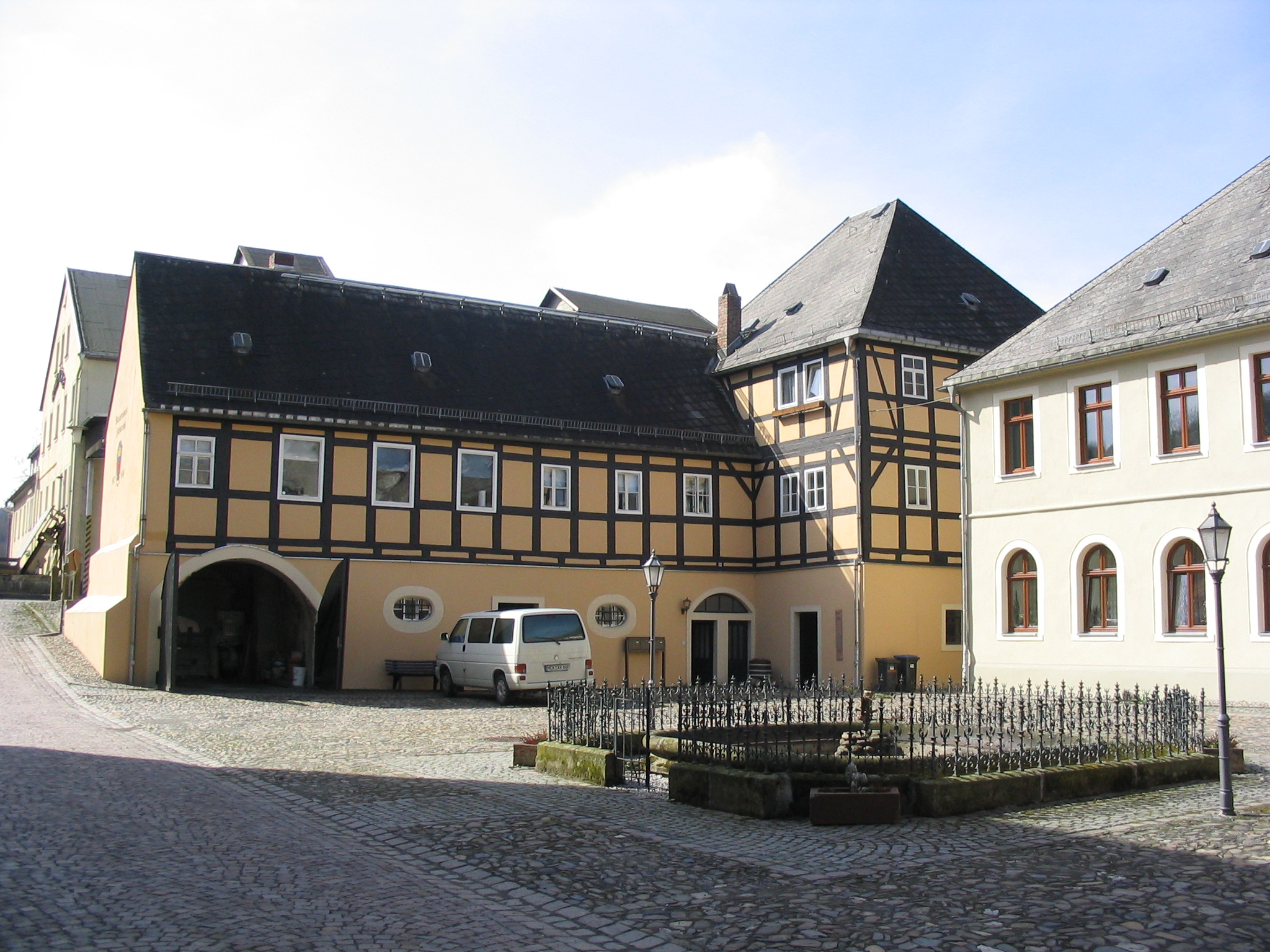
Zschopenthal Blue Colour Works: the stables

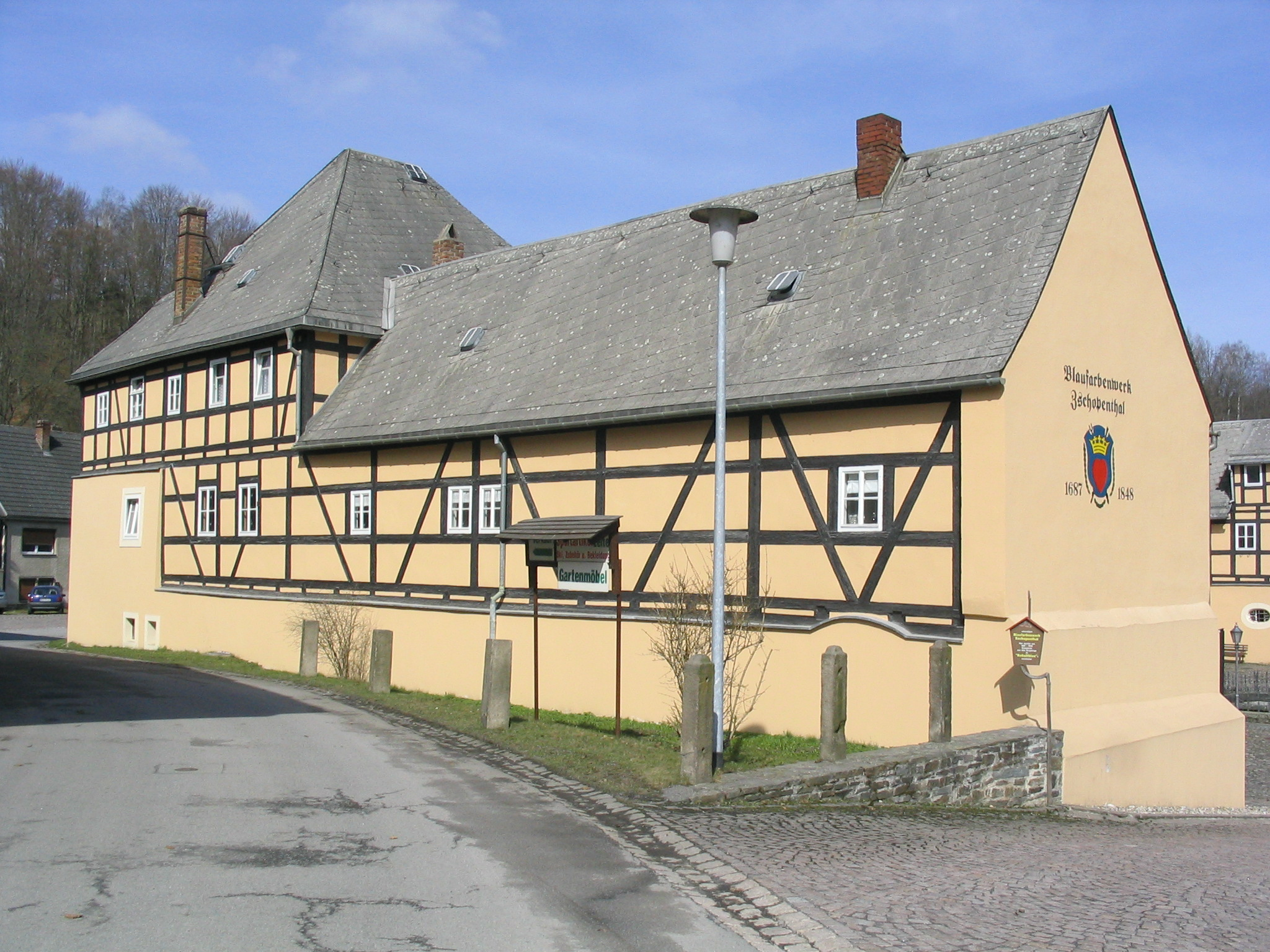
Zschopenthal Blue Colour Works: looking out of the entrance

The Zschopenthal Blue Colour Works (German: Blaufarbenwerk Zschopenthal) was a paintworks in the Ore Mountains that manufactured blue glass paste. It is located in the village of Zschopenthal in the parish of Grünhainichen in the German state of Saxony.

== History ==
The paintworks at Zschopenthal had originally been founded in Annaberg. Difficulties in obtaining firewood motivated the co-owner, Bergrat Caspar Sigismund von Berbisdorf, in 1684 to move it to Zschopenthal. Von Berbisdorf already owned an iron hammer mill and the necessary real estate in Zschopenthal. In 1689 a metal hammer mill is recorded, that manufactured stove tops. In 1692, this mill moved to Neunzehnhain.

In 1687 the works began manufacturing blue cobalt colour paste, used for painting porcelain and ceramic. According to tradition this was exported by von Berbisdorf to Delft and Venice. The paintworks had its own jurisdiction and also its own school.

In 1850 as a result of competition from England and the introduction of coal-firing, the Zschopenthal factory was closed and the business merged with the factory in Pfannenstiel.

The paintworks was run by three generations of the family of chemist, Clemens Winkler: his great grandfather Christian Heinrich Winkler, grandfather (August Fürchtegott Winkler) and father (Kurt Alexander Winkler).

In 1848 the Zschopau master weaver, Johann Gottlieb Wunderlich, bought the entire factory complex and built what was in its day a very modern weaving mill.

The buildings of the former paintworks have been very largely preserved and have been maintained for several years to some degree as an industrial monument.

The old industrial site consisted of the three-storey factory building with a cross-vault on the ground floor, whose portal is marked with the year 1687, the timber-framed building with turrets, bell and weather vane from 1719, the stables and the massive, two-story mansion with a hip roof.

== Today ==
The tradition of blue colourmen has been maintained for a number of years by a group known as the Hüttenknappschaft Zschopenthal, part of the Waldkirchen Local History Society (Heimatverein Waldkirchen).

== Sources ==
- Das mittlere Zschopaugebiet. Edition no. 1 Akademie-Verlag Berlin, Berlin 1977 (Werte unserer Heimat. Vol. 28). p. 137–139.
