= Waldkirchen, Saxony =

Waldkirchen
- Ortsteil of Grünhainichen
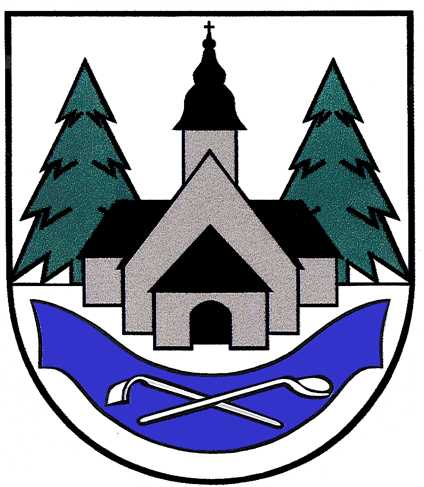
- Coat of arms
- Interactive map of Waldkirchen
- Location within Germany Location within Saxony
- Coordinates: 50°46′N 13°7′E
- Country: Germany
- State: Saxony
- District: Erzgebirgskreis
- Town: Grünhainichen

Area
  - Total: 8.96 km^{2} (3.46 sq mi)
- Elevation: 453 m (1,486 ft)

Population (2006-12-31)
  - Total: 1,185
  - Density: 132/km^{2} (343/sq mi)
- Time zone: UTC+01:00 (CET)
  - Summer (DST): UTC+02:00 (CEST)
- Postal codes: 09437
- Dialling codes: 037294
- Vehicle registration: MEK
- Website: www.wildenstein.ws

Waldkirchen is a village and former municipality in the district of Erzgebirgskreis, in Saxony, Germany. Since 1 March 2009 it has been part of the municipality of Grünhainichen.

Waldkirchen grew outwards in the direction of Grünhainichen from a church erected at the end of the village, from which the name of the village is derived ("forest church"), along an unnamed side valley of the river Zschopau. With the Reformation in 1539 Waldkirchen became an independent parish. The settlement of Zschopenthal (mentioned in church records for the first time in 1663) was established on the river Zschopau itself where, in 1687, a paintworks was built.

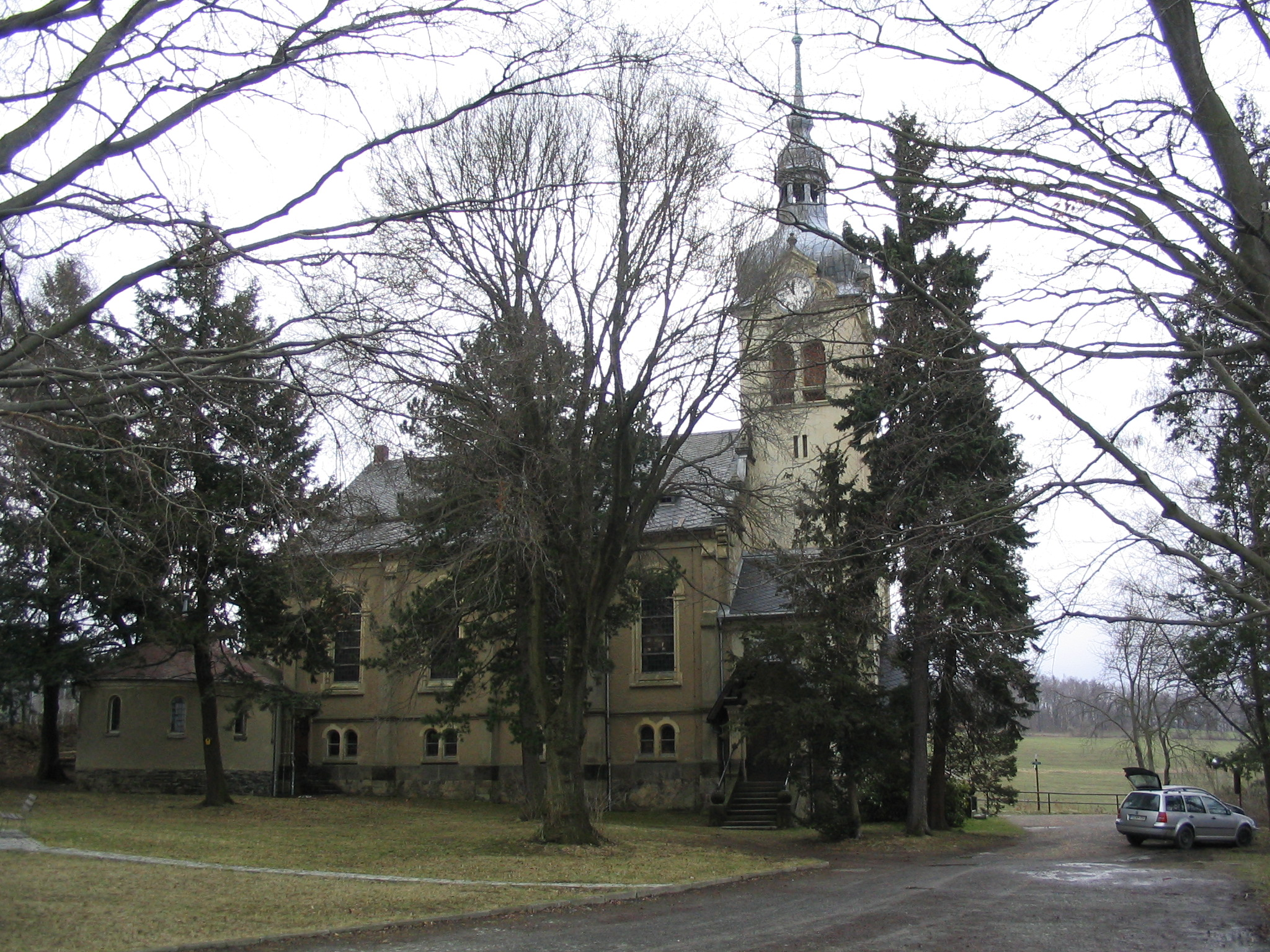
St. George's Church

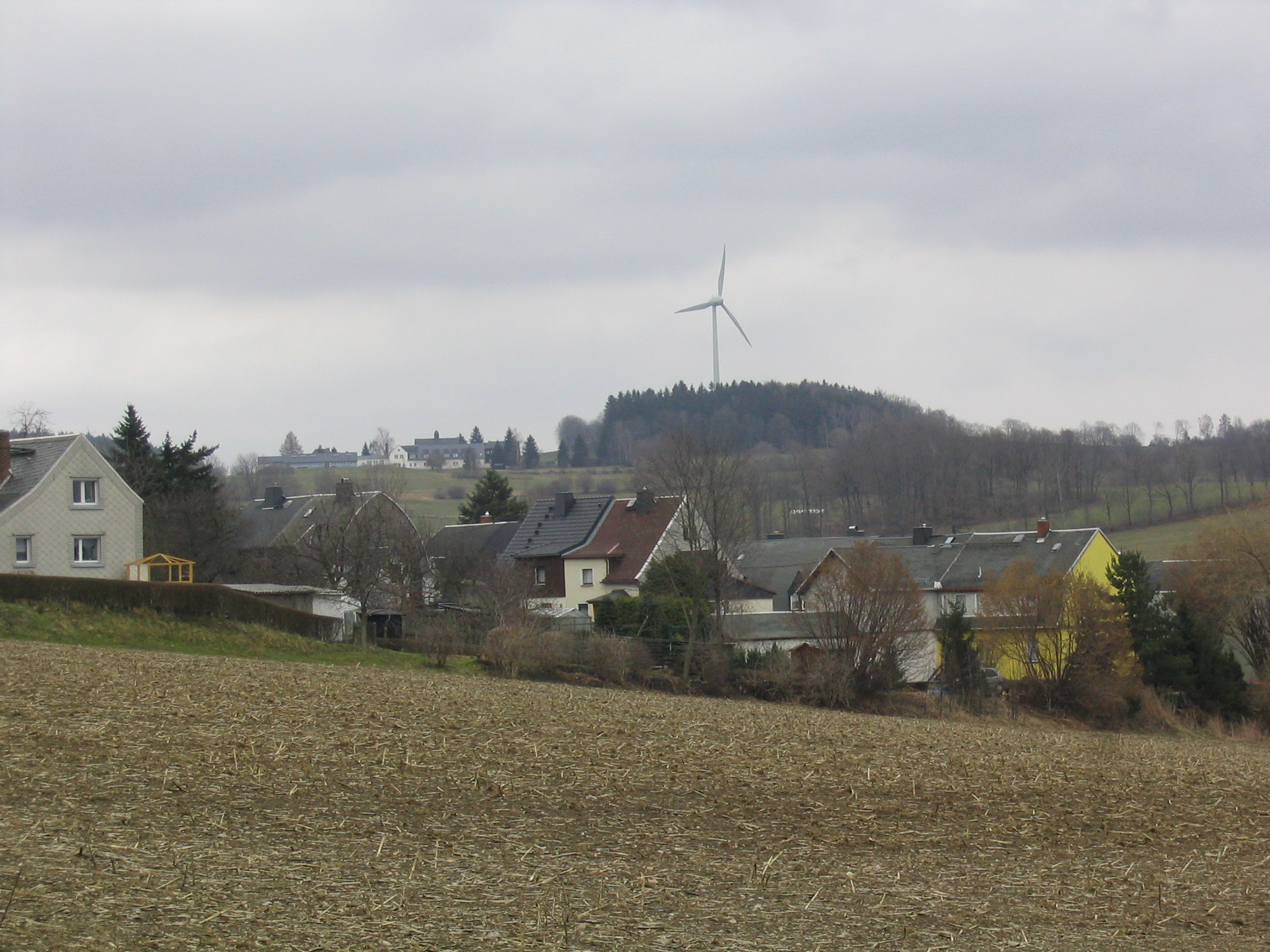
View of Waldkirchen

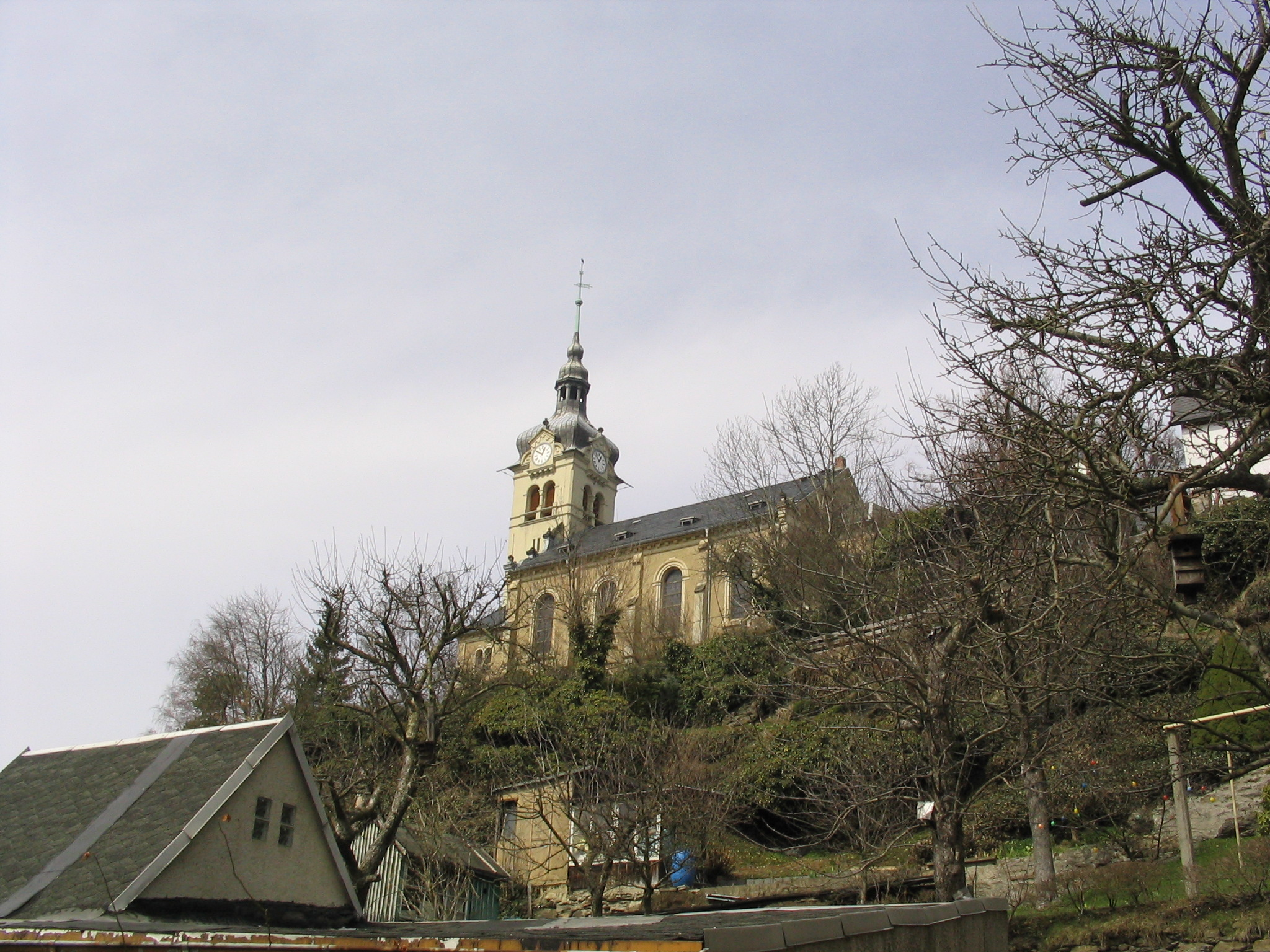
St. George's Church

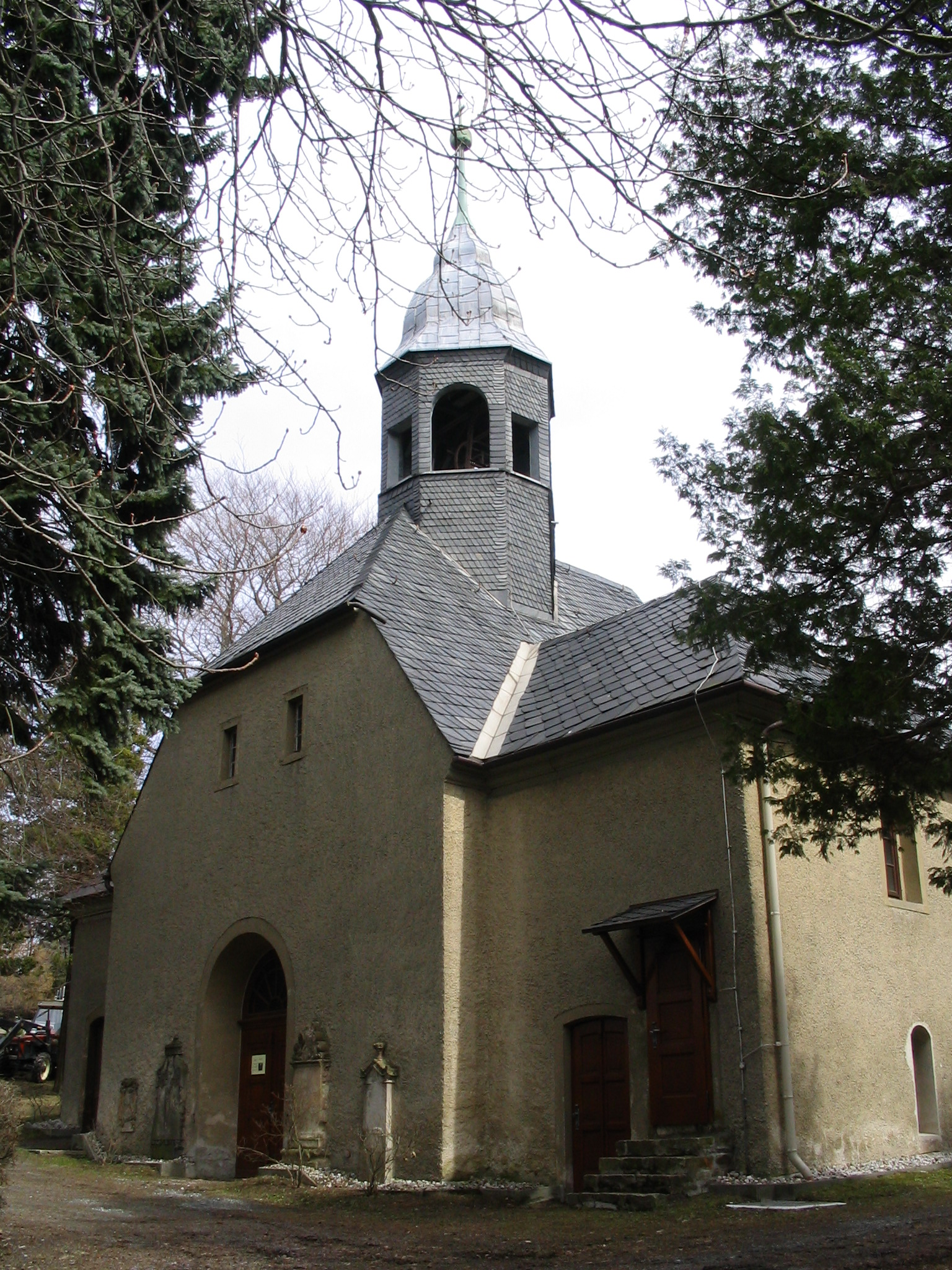
Cemetery chapel, old church
