= Birgit Sawyer =

Swedish historian (1945 – 2016)

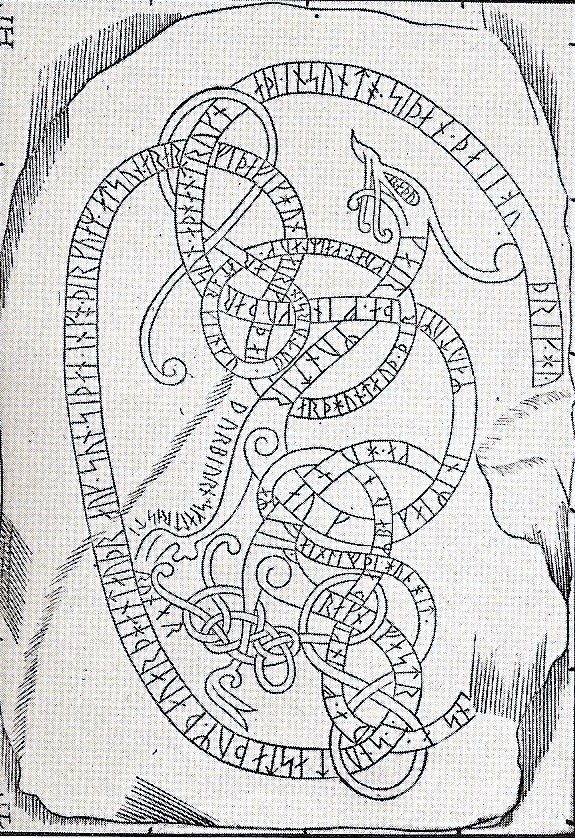
Runestones commissioned by Gerlög and Inga prompted Birgit's work, Viking Age Rune Stones

Birgit Sawyer (1945 – 2016) was a Swedish historian specializing in medieval Scandinavia, particularly runestones and medieval Scandinavian women.

== Biography ==
She was born Birgit Sandberg in Gothenburg in 1945. With her first husband, Johnny Strand, she had three daughters.

She married fellow historian Peter Sawyer in 1981. She earned her PhD in History from the University of Gothenburg in 1981, where she then became associate professor.

She held a chair in medieval history at the University of Trondheim from 1996 to 2007, during which time she moved back and forth between Trondheim and Uppsala.

In 2000 she published The Viking-age Rune-stones: Custom and Commemoration in Early Medieval Scandinavia after encountering runic inscriptions carved by women, Gerlög and Inga, and becoming intrigued by how women could commission rune stones and use them to stake territorial claims. She was the co-founder of a biennial conference on women in medieval Scandinavia.

She was known affectionately as 'Bibi', and she died of lung cancer in 2016.

== Select bibliography ==
- 'Women and Men in Gesta Denorum' (PhD thesis)
- Viking Age Rune Stones: Custom and Commemoration in Early Medieval Scandinavia (2000)

=== With Peter Sawyer ===
- The Christianization of Scandinavia: A Symposium Report (1985)
- Medieval Scandinavia: From Conversion to Reformation, c.800–1500 (1993)
- Die Welt der Wikinger (2002)
