= Amadeus Wendt =

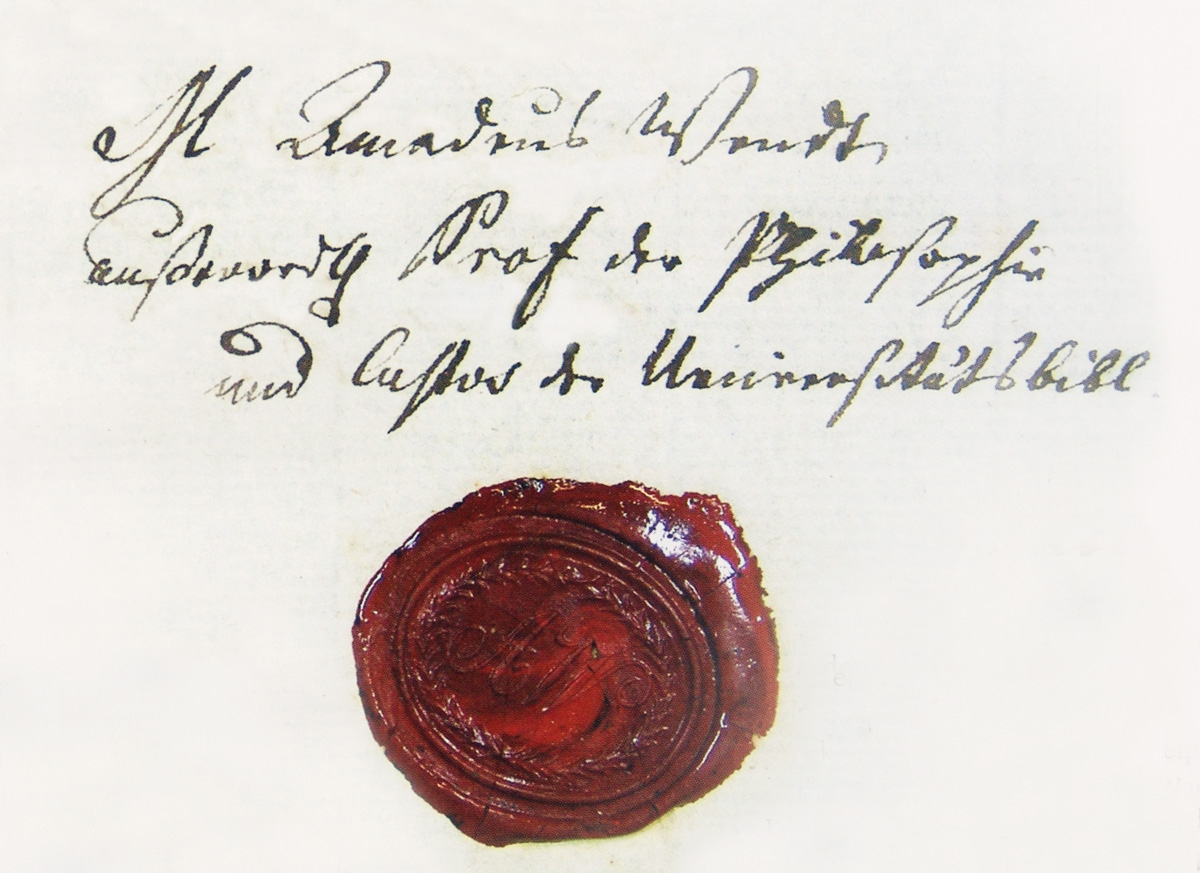
Signature and Seal of Amadeus Wendt from 1811

Johann Amadeus Wendt (29 September 1783, in Leipzig – 15 December 1836, in Göttingen) was a German philosopher and music theorist.

== Life ==
Wendt came from a modest background. He attended the Thomas School in Leipzig as an outside student. As a boy, he demonstrated a pronounced interest in music, and therefore received theoretical and practical music lessons from the conductor of the Gewandhaus Orchestra and later Cantor at Saint Thomas, Johann Gottfried Schicht.

Although he was encouraged to study theology by his family, he instead pursued philosophy and philology at the University of Leipzig and also attended lectures by the psychologist Friedrich August Carus. At the end of his studies, he received his doctorate in 1804. He then went to the countryside as a tutor and a year later returned to Leipzig with his noble pupil and studied law together with him. In preparation for his philosophical academic career he completed his Habilitation thesis at the Faculty of Philosophy of the University of Leipzig on the topic De fundamento et origine domini. He joined the faculty as associate professor of philosophy in 1811, becoming a full professor in 1816. He was also curator of the University Library.

The range of topics covered in his lectures was broad, and included religious philosophy, philological jurisprudence, psychology, aesthetics, history and philosophy. Wendt paid special attention to music. From 1821 to 1829 he was a member of the Leipzig Gewandhaus Concert Directorate. He wrote numerous articles on musical topics. In 1836, his paper Über den gegenwärtigen Zustand der Musik (On the Present State of Music) appeared, which examined the development of music, especially in Germany. In it, he used the term "Classical Period" to describe Haydn, Mozart and Beethoven for the first time, which gave rise to the term Viennese Classicism.

In 1829 he was awarded the chair of philosophy at the Georg-August-Universität in Göttingen, where he also held the office of rector. In 1833, he became a member of the Göttingen Academy of Sciences.

Wendt was editor of the "Leipziger Kunstblatt für gebildete Kunstfreunde, insbesondere für Theater und Musik" (1817 and 1818), the "Taschenbuch zum geelligen Vergnügen" (1821–25) as well as the "Deutscher Musenalmanachs", first in Leipzig and later in Göttingen. He wrote for the "Allgemeine Musikalische Zeitung" and the "Zeitung für die elegante Welt". Enmeshed in German academic circles, Wendt was also personally acquainted with Georg Wilhelm Friedrich Hegel.

Wendt married Henriette Dölitzsch, the daughter of a Leipzig official. Their daughter, Natalie Auguste, married the English writer John Mitchell Kemble in 1836.

In Leipzig, Wendt was a member of the freemason lodge "Minerva zu den drei Palmen," where he held the office of speaker for a time.

== Selected works ==
- Grundzüge der philosophischen Rechtslehre, Leipzig 1811
- Reden über Religion oder die Religion an sich und in ihrem Verhältniß zur Wissenschaft, Kunst usw. Sulzbach 1813
- De rerum prncipiis secundum Pythagoreos, Leipzig 1817
- Philosophie der Kunst, Leipzig 1817
- Rossini’s Leben und Treiben, Leipzig 1824
- Ueber Zweck, Mittel, Gegenwart und Zukunft der Freimaurerei, Leipzig 1828
- Ueber die Hauptperioden der schönen Künste oder die Kunst im Laufe der Weltgeschichte dargestellt, Leipzig 1831

== Literature ==
- Max Heinze (1897). "Wendt, Amadeus". Allgemeine Deutsche Biographie (in German). Vol. 42. Leipzig: Duncker & Humblot. pp. 747–748.
