= Walter de Gray Birch =

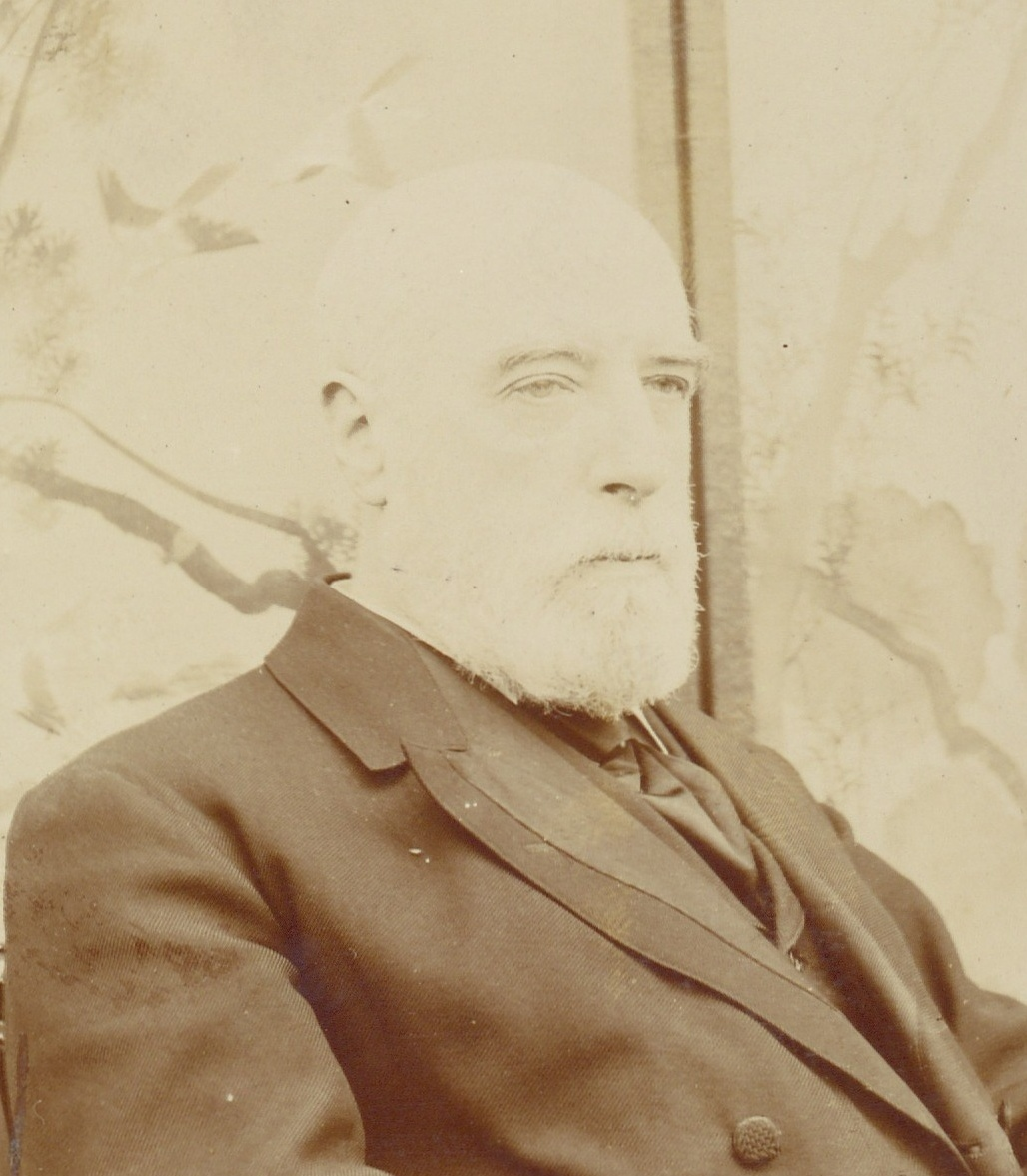
- Birch at the Turin Academy of Science in 1900, age 58.
- Born: 1 January 1842
- Died: 8 March 1924 (aged 82)
- Occupations: Curator, Editor, Librarian

Academic background
- Education: Charterhouse School
- Alma mater: Trinity College, Cambridge

Academic work
- Discipline: History, Philology
- Sub-discipline: Anglo Saxon Studies, Heraldry
- Institutions: British Museum, Department of Western Manuscripts

Walter de Gray Birch FSA (1 Jan 1842 – 8 March 1924) was an English historian, editor and author. He is best known for his Cartularium Saxonicum — A Collection of Charters Relating to Anglo-Saxon History, which supersedes John Mitchell Kemble's Codex Diplomaticus Aevi Saxonici.

== Early life and education ==
Walter was born on New Year's Day 1842, the son of Dr Samuel Birch, Keeper of the Department of Oriental Antiquities at the British Museum, and Charlotte F. Gray, sister of John Edward Gray. He was educated in Charterhouse School and Trinity College, Cambridge, and started work as curator of western manuscripts in the British Museum in 1864, age 22, transcribing and cataloguing Anglo-Saxon charters.

== Career ==
Birch was a prolific author whilst in his position as curator of western manuscripts at the British Museum. He was a Fellow of the Society of Antiquaries, Member of the Royal Academies of Seville and Turin and honourable member of the Hispanic Society of America. He held the positions of Honourable Secretary, Editor, vice-president, and Treasurer for many years of the British Archaeological Association.

During his tenure at the British Museum he transcribed and published most of the surviving Anglo Saxon Charters as the Cartularium Saxonicum in three volumes between 1885 and 1893, plus an index to named persons in 1899.

In 1902 he left the British Museum to become personal librarian and curator to the 4th Marquess of Bute.

== Death ==
Birch died in Monte Carlo on 8 March 1924.

== Notable works ==
His large output includes:

- John Mitchell Kemble. Walter de Gray Birch (ed.). The Saxons in England: A History of the English Commonwealth till the Period of the Norman Conquest. Vol. (2 vols).
- Walter de Gray Birch (1902). A History of Neath Abbey.
- Walter de Gray Birch. History of the Scottish Seals. Vol. (2 vols).
- Walter de Gray Birch. Domesday Book: A popular account of the Exchequer Manuscript so called. Vol. (2 vols).
- Birch, Walter de Gray (1885). Cartularium saxonicum: a collection of charters relating to Anglo-Saxon history: AD 430-738. Vol. 1 Pt.1. London: Whiting.
- Birch, Walter de Gray (1885). Cartularium saxonicum: a collection of charters relating to Anglo-Saxon history: AD 741-839. Vol. 1 Pt.2. London: Whiting.
- Birch, Walter de Gray (1887). Cartularium saxonicum: a collection of charters relating to Anglo-Saxon history: AD 840-928. Vol. 2 Pt.1. London: Whiting.
- Birch, Walter de Gray (1887). Cartularium saxonicum: a collection of charters relating to Anglo-Saxon history: AD 928-947. Vol. 2 Pt.2. London: Whiting.
- Birch, Walter de Gray (1893). Cartularium saxonicum: a collection of charters relating to Anglo-Saxon history: AD 948-959. Vol. 3. London: Whiting.
- Birch, Walter de Gray (1899). Inder Saxonicus: An Index to All the Names of Persons in the Cartularium Saxonicum. London: Phillimore & Company.

== See also ==
- List of Anglo-Saxon Charters
- Peter Sawyer
