= Peter Sawyer (historian) =

British historian (1928–2018)

Peter Hayes Sawyer
- Peter Sawyer teaching a seminar at the University of Leeds, c. 1983.
- Born: 25 June 1928; Oxford
- Died: 7 July 2018 (aged 90); Uppsala
- Occupation: Historian

Academic background
- Education: Oxford University (BA)
- Alma mater: Oxford University

Academic work
- Discipline: Medievalist
- Sub-discipline: Anglo Saxon Studies
- Main interests: Anglo-Saxon Charters

Peter Hayes Sawyer (25 June 1928 – 7 July 2018) was a British historian. His work on the Vikings was highly influential, as was his scholarship on Medieval England. Sawyer's early work The Age of the Vikings argued that the Vikings were "traders not raiders", overturning the previously held view that the Vikings' voyages were only focused on destruction and pillaging.

Sawyer is particularly known for his Anglo-Saxon Charters: an Annotated List. Anglo-Saxon charters are referenced by "Sawyer" numbers (abbreviated 'S' as for example in charter "S 407") according to his catalogue.

== Biography ==
Sawyer was born in Oxford, England, on 25 June 1928, the son of Grace Woodbridge and Bill Sawyer, a tobacconist. He grew up in Oxford, except for time spent with relatives in Milford Haven during WWII.

Sawyer studied at Oxford University from 1948 to 1951, where he was a member of Jesus College and graduated with a B.A. Honours in Modern History. He then was a research student at the University of Manchester from 1951 to 1953. After his time in Manchester, Sawyer was an assistant at the University of Edinburgh from 1953 to 1956 and a lecturer in medieval history at the University of Birmingham from 1957 to 1964. He taught at the University of Leeds from 1964, becoming professor of Medieval History in 1970. There, in collaboration with Robert Stuart Hoyt, he founded the International Medieval Bibliography. He retired early from Leeds in 1982 and was subsequently (in 1998) given the title emeritus professor. Sawyer continued his teaching and research at University of Gothenburg as a docent, and had various stints as a visiting professor in the United States: at the University of Minnesota from 1966 to 1967 and then again in 1984, and at the University of California, Berkeley in 1985. Between 1996 and 2006 he worked in Trondheim (where his wife Birgit Sawyer was a professor of Medieval History), connected to NTNU, and from 2006 he lived and worked in Uppsala.

He died in Uppsala, aged 90, in July 2018.

== Works ==
- Sawyer, Peter (1957–62). Textus Roffensis: Rochester Cathedral Library Manuscript A.3.5. Early English manuscripts in facsimile. Vol. 7, 11. Copenhagen: Rosenkilde og Bagger. 118+117 pages. OCLC 63444797.
- Sawyer, Peter H. (1962). The Age of the Vikings (1978 2nd ed.). London: E. Arnold. 275 pages. ISBN 9780713158366. OCLC 463278812.
- Sawyer, Peter H. (1968). Anglo-Saxon Charters: An Annotated List and Bibliography. Guides and handbooks. Vol. 8. Royal Historical Society. xiii–538 pages. OCLC 460956. (Subsequently digitised and revised as The Electronic Sawyer: Online Catalogue of Anglo-Saxon Charters, first published 2010)
- Sawyer, Peter H. (1978). From Roman Britain to Norman England (1998 2nd ed.). Routledge. xii–322 pages. ISBN 9780203450468. OCLC 52489970.
- Sawyer, Peter H. (1979). Charters of Burton Abbey. Anglo-Saxon charters. Vol. 2. Oxford University Press for the British Academy. lv–93 pages. ISBN 9780197259405. OCLC 6041283.
- Sawyer, Peter (1985). Kungar och vikingar: Norden och Europa 700–1100 [Kings and Vikings: The Nordic Countries and Europe 700–1100]. Panorama (in Swedish). Translated by Erik Frykman. Stockholm: Norstedt. 219 pages. ISBN 9789118436116. OCLC 185803536.
- Sawyer, Peter H. (1989). The Making of Sweden. Alingsås: Viktoria Bokförlag. iii–60 pages. ISBN 9789186708085. OCLC 21221268.
- Sawyer, Peter; Sawyer, Birgit (1993). Medieval Scandinavia: From Conversion to Reformation, circa 800–1500. The Nordic Series. Vol. 17. University of Minnesota Press. xvi–265 pages. ISBN 9780816617395. OCLC 489584487.
- Sawyer, Peter H. (1997). The Oxford Illustrated History of the Vikings. Oxford University Press. xv–298 pages. ISBN 9780198205265. OCLC 751158622. "Peter Sawyer The Oxford illustrated history of the Vikings."
- Sawyer, Peter (1998). Anglo-Saxon Lincolnshire. A History of Lincolnshire. Vol. 3. Lincoln: History of Lincolnshire Committee for the Society for Lincolnshire History and Archaeology. xv–289 pages. ISBN 9780902668027. OCLC 906849208.
- Sawyer, Peter (2013). The Wealth of Anglo-Saxon England. Oxford University Press. xi–155 pages. ISBN 9780199253937. OCLC 847547281.

== See also ==
- Anglo-Saxon Charters: an Annotated List and Bibliography
- Walter de Gray Birch
- John Mitchell Kemble
- List of Anglo-Saxon Charters
