= Nickelhütte Aue =

Coordinates: 50°21′03″N 12°25′49″E

Nickelhütte Aue GmbH
- Company type: Limited liability company (Gesellschaft mit beschränkter Haftung)
- Industry: Metallurgy
- Founded: 1635 as paintmill, Name changed to Nickelhütte at the start of the 20th century
- Headquarters: Aue (Sachsen), Germany
- Key people: Managing Partner: Volker Carluss (since August 2008), Gert Windisch
- Number of employees: about 400
- Website: www.nickelhuette-aue.de/

The Nickelhütte Aue is a modern manufacturing site in East Germany for pure non-ferrous metals like nickel, copper, cobalt, molybdenum, vanadium and tungsten. It is descended from the historic Niederpfannenstiel Blue Colour Works (German: Blaufarbenwerk Niederpfannenstiel), a paintworks that was founded in 1635 by Veit Hans Schnorr in Pfannenstiel near Aue.

== Sources ==
- Aue, Mosaiksteine der Geschichte, Hrsg. Stadtverwaltung Aue, Druckerei und Verlag Mike Rockstroh, Aue 1997; pages 49–66 Die Blaufarbenwerke sind Fabriken, die sonst nirgends in Sachsen als im Erzgebirge anzutreffen, und sind daher unserer Aufmerksamkeit würdig.
- Manfred Blechschmidt, Klaus Walther: Vom Blaufarbenwerk Niederpfannenstiel zum volkseigenen Betrieb Nickelhütte Aue – Episoden und Bilder aus 350 Jahren Geschichte. Lößnitz, Rockstroh, 1985
- Siegfried Sieber: Geschichte des Blaufarbenwerkes Niederpfannenstiel in Aue im Erzgebirge anläßlich seiner Dreihundertjahrfeier. Schwarzenberg, Glückauf-Verl., 1935
- Mike Haustein: Das Erbe des Blaufarbenwerks 1635–2010. Nickelhütte Aue, 2010 ISBN 978-3-931770-88-4
- Ernst Ludwig Schubarth: Elemente der technischen Chemie, zum Gebrauch beim Unterricht im Königl. Gewerbinstitut und den Provinzial-Gewerbschulen; 2. Ausgabe 1835, A. Rücker, Hier: 14. Kapitel: S.151 ff - Smalte, Wismuth, Kobalt (Volltext, p. 151, at Google Books).
