= Vend =

Vend may refer to:

- Vend (ethnonym), a German and Hungarian term for Slavs
- Vend (letter) in Old Norse
- Vends, a Balto-Finnic people from Livonia
- Vend (software), point-of-sale cloud provider from New Zealand
- Vend Marketplaces ASA, a Norway-based operator of online marketplaces

== See also ==
- Vending
- Vendor
