= Wendt & Kühn =

Wendt & Kühn KG
- Company type: Limited commercial partnership (Kommanditgesellschaft)
- Founded: 1915
- Headquarters: Grünhainichen
- Products: Wooden figures and music boxes
- Number of employees: 155
- Website: www.wendt-kuehn.de

Wendt & Kühn KG is a manufacturer of painted wooden figures and music boxes in the Ore Mountain tradition that have become collectible. All their products are produced by hand and only made in the German federal state of Saxony. The best known figures are the Grünhainichen angels, with their characteristic green wings and their eleven white dots, and the flower children.

The company was founded in 1915 by Grete Wendt (1887–1979) and Margarete Kühn. Today the firm is in the hands of the Wendt family. Their range currently comprises about 400 figures. The company's headquarters is in Grünhainichen in Saxony. The firm employs 155 workers, of whom about 80 are figure painters and four are painters who are especially responsible for the faces of the figures.

== Sources ==
- Ehrhardt Heinold: Himmlische Boten aus dem Erzgebirge. Die weltberühmten Engel von Wendt & Kühn. ("Heavenly Messengers from the Ore Mountains. The World-Famous Angels of Wendt & Kühn."), 2nd ed., Husum 2008
- Nina Lübbren, ‘Renée Sintenis, Wendt & Kühn, Lotte Pritzel: Modes, Markets and Materials in Domestic Objects, 1910-1930’, in Deborah Ascher Barnstone and Maria Makela (eds), Material Modernity: Innovations in Art, Design, and Architecture in the Weimar Republic, London etc.: Bloomsbury, 2022, pp. 221-246.

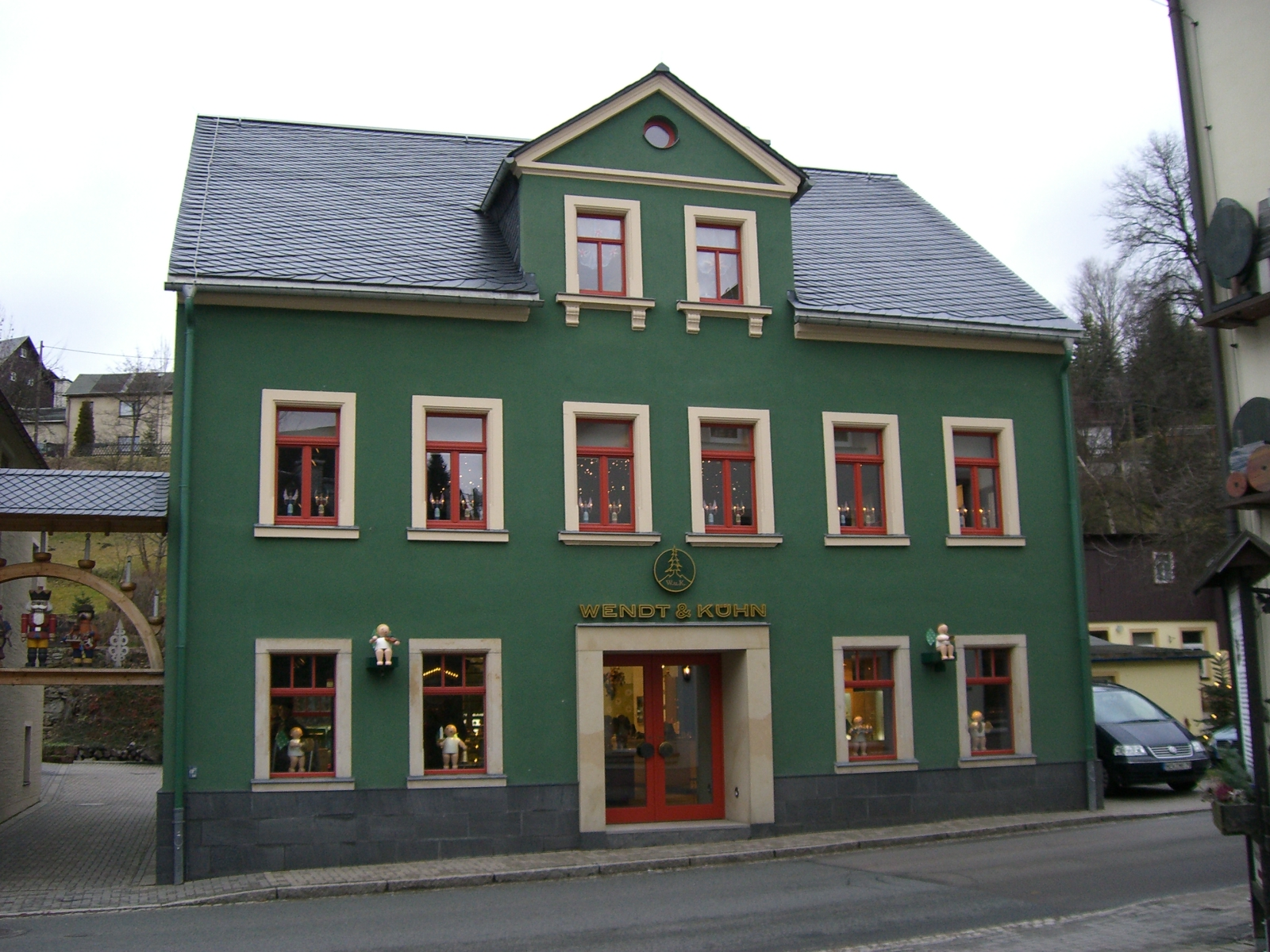
A Wendt & Kühn shop in Seiffen
