= Mats Wendt =

Swedish composer (born 1965)

Mats Wendt (born in 1965) is a Swedish classical composer and artist. His best known work internationally is Eddan – the invincible sword of the elf-smith, a 16-hour-long "cybersymphonic" work on Norse mythology according to Viktor Rydberg. Five hours from Eddan was performed in Bayreuth 2003 during the annual Wagner festspiele, in Wahnfried, Wagner's former home, now the Richard Wagner museum. The work was first performed in its entirety in Reykjavík in 2009. Prior to Eddan, he's been inspired by works of writers like William Blake and T. S. Eliot.

Wendt is also the originator of "cybersymphony", a concept for transferring the symphony orchestra to computers and by this create a super instrument that is independent of development of hard and software. He's performed his work at the Swedish National Museum of Science and Technology.

== Cybersymphony ==
The concept of Cybersymphony was created by Wendt in 1993 to build a foundation for symphonic music created by computers and synthesizers.

The "instrument" used to perform a cybersymphony consists of two things: the cybersymphonic law that defines what the instrument is, and any synthesizer that meets the requirements. This means that, in the absence of a physical instrument (and the small differences caused by the analogue), a consistently defined sound is available.

The Cybersymphonic Law summarised:

- All sounds must have a real counterpart (violin, oboe and so on, with the correct register span).
- All instruments must be played like the real counterpart (i.e.: technical limitations must be observed).
- All instruments or instrument sections must be located on separate midi channels
- No sampling of mixed sounds may occur.
- The Orchestral dynamic is created by the parts individual dynamics.
- No dynamic event may occur in the section sounds or instruments sounds
- Dynamic is formed by continuous volume and the keystroke
- The orchestral timbre is created through the sum of the sounding separate midi channels

== Selected works ==
- Cyborg Piano Concerto nr 1 (1981)
- The child and the soul of logic (1984)
- Three Psychological portraits (1989)
- Psychopath predominantly aggressive
- Schizophrenic reaction type catatonia
- Die grosse compressed crocodile symphony
- Urbana
- Voluspa
- Baltic ode (1990)
- Excalibur Piano Concerto nr 3 (1993)
- Tales from lord of the rings 1 (1993)
- Tales from lord of the rings 2 (1995)
- Symphony for a dead world (1994)
- The Insects Collection (1993–1995)
- The Omega point theory (1994)
- The Marriage of heaven and hell (1996)
- The Millennium Symphony (1997)
- WasteLands (1997)
- Europe a prophecy (1998)
- Eddan — the invincible sword of the elf-smith (2008)

== Sources ==
- STIM - the Swedish Performing Rights Society
