= Grünhainichen =

- Municipality
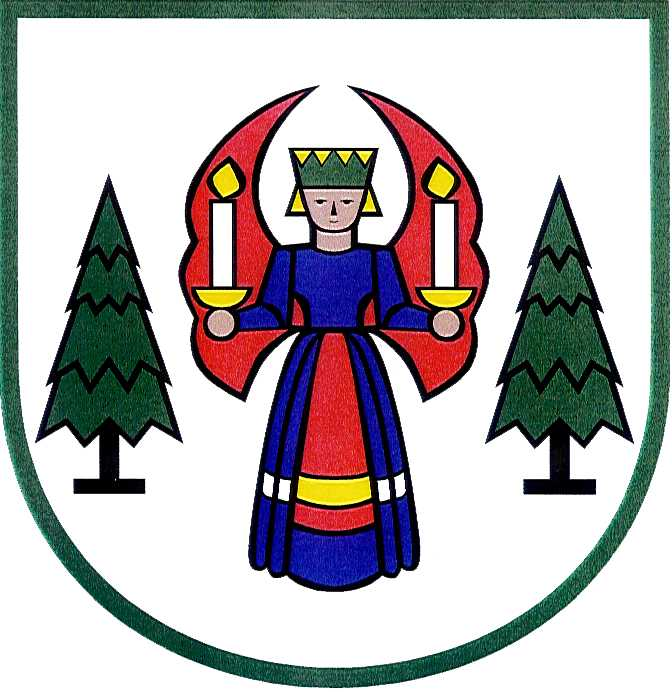
- Coat of arms

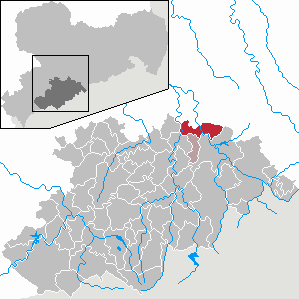
- Location of Grünhainichen within Erzgebirgskreis district
- Interactive map of Grünhainichen
- Location within Germany Location within Saxony
- Coordinates: 50°46′3″N 13°9′14″E
- Country: Germany
- State: Saxony
- District: Erzgebirgskreis
- Municipal assoc.: Wildenstein

Government
  - Mayor (2018–25): Robert Arnold

Area
  - Total: 28.79 km^{2} (11.12 sq mi)
- Elevation: 421 m (1,381 ft)

Population (2025-12-31)
  - Total: 2,993
  - Density: 104.0/km^{2} (269.3/sq mi)
- Time zone: UTC+01:00 (CET)
  - Summer (DST): UTC+02:00 (CEST)
- Postal codes: 09579, 09437
- Dialling codes: 037294, 03725
- Vehicle registration: ERZ, ANA, ASZ, AU, MAB, MEK, STL, SZB, ZP
- Website: www.gruenhainichen.eu

Grünhainichen is a municipality in the district Erzgebirgskreis, in Saxony, Germany. On 1 March 2009, Grünhainichen and the neighboring municipality Waldkirchen were merged. On 1 January 2015, the former municipality Borstendorf became part of Grünhainichen.

== Economy and infrastructure ==
=== Companies ===
- Wendt & Kühn KG
- Druckerei Emil Gutermuth
- Zabag Anlagentechnik GmbH
- Grünperga Papier GmbH
- Kartonagenfabrik K. Emil Nebel
- Kunsthandwerk Christine Blank
- Erzi Qualitätsprodukte aus Holz GmbH

=== Transport ===
- Flöha Valley Railway
- Bus connexions to Eppendorf, Zschopau, Flöha, Augustusburg
