= Friedrich August Carus =

German philosopher (1770–1807)

Friedrich August Carus (26 April 1770, Bautzen – 6 February 1807, Leipzig) was a German philosopher. He was the father of surgeon Ernst August Carus (1797–1854).

From 1788 to 1793 he studied philosophy and theology at the universities of Leipzig and Göttingen. In 1796 he became an associate professor of philosophy at Leipzig, where in 1805 he attained a full professorship. In Leipzig he also served as a preacher (Frühprediger) at the University Church. As a philosopher he was influenced by the writings of Immanuel Kant and Friedrich Heinrich Jacobi. After his death, his principal philosophical, psychological, theological and historical works were edited and published in seven volumes by Ferdinand Gotthelf Hand and Johann David Goldhorn with the title "Nachgelassene Werke" (1808–10).

== Published works ==
=== Books ===
- Denkmal seltener Vatertreue, errichtet als ein schwacher Zeuge tiefgefühlter kindlicher Dankbarkeit, Budissin 1792 [written on the occasion of his father's death on September 1, 1792]
- Historia Antiquior Sententiarum Ecclesiae Graecae De Accomodatione Christo Inprimis Et Apostolis Tributa, Leipzig 1793 [Doctoral Dissertation: October 9, 1793]
- De Anaxagoreae Cosmo-Theologiae Fontibus, Leipzig 1797 [Inaugural Address: June 21, 1797] (Reprinted in NW 4, 689-762)
- Nachgelassene Werke (NW):
  - 1/2 Psychologie, Leipzig 1808 (2nd edition: Leipzig 1823)
  - 3 Geschichte der Psychologie, Leipzig 1808 (Reprint: Berlin 1990)
  - 4 Ideen zur Geschichte der Philosophie, Leipzig 1809
  - 5 Die Psychologie der Hebräer, Leipzig 1809
  - 6 Ideen zur Geschichte der Menschheit, Leipzig 1809
  - 7 Moralphilosophie und Religionsphilosophie, Leipzig 1810

=== Articles ===
- Über die Sagen von Hermotimos aus Klazomenae. Ein kritischer Versuch, in: G. G. Fülleborn (Hrsg.), Beyträge zur Geschichte der Philosophie, Neuntes Stück, Jena 1798, 58-147 (Reprinted in NW 4, 330-392)
- Zwei Erklärungen über eine Stelle im Allg. litt. Anz. 1798, No. CLXXXI, S. 1868, den Dr. und Prof. Werner K. Ludw. Ziegler in Rostock betreffend, in: Allgemeiner Litterarischer Anzeiger, Vierter Band, Nr. 27, 18. Februar 1799, 257
- Anaxagoras aus Klazomenae und sein Zeitgeist. Eine geschichtliche Zusammenstellung, in: G. G. Fülleborn (Hrsg.), Beyträge zur Geschichte der Philosophie, Zehntes Stück, Jena 1799, 162-282 (Reprinted in NW 4, 395-478)
- [Review of] Ueber Offenbarung und Mythologie. Als Nachtrag zur Religion innerhalb der Grenzen der reinen Vernunft, in: Neues theologisches Journal, Jg. 1801, 337-357
- Allgemeine Uebersicht der bekannter gewordenen einzelnen Säcular-Predigten, in: Neues theologisches Journal, Jg. 1802, 199-216; 305-320 [Reviews]
- Revision der Bearbeitung der Empirischen Psychologie in den letzten drey Quinquennien des achtzehnten Jahrhunderts, in: Revision der Literatur für die Jahre 1785-1800 in Ergänzungsblättern zur Allg. Lit. Zeitung dieses Zeitraums, 2. Jg., Jena 1802; 3. Jg., Jena 1803
- Fortsetzung der Anzeige der Säcular-Predigten, in: Neues theologisches Journal, Jg. 1803, 557-614 [Reviews]
- Geschichte der Philosophie, in: Neue Leipziger Literaturzeitung, 57. Stück, 9. November 1803, 913-926; 93. Stück, 21. Juli 1806, 1473-1488 [Reviews]
- [Review of] Magazin für Religions- Moral- und Kirchen-Geschichte. Herausgegeben von D. Carl Friedrich Stäudlin, in: Neues theologisches Journal, Jg. 1803, 109-132; 217-237; 309-338
- [Review of] Die Religion der Vernunft und des Herzens, eine berichtigte Darstellung der Ideen zur Philosophie über die Religion (und den Geist des reinen Christenthums), von Carl (H. G.) Venturini, in: Neues theologisches Journal, Jg. 1803, 327-330
- [Review of] Geschichte der Religionsphilosophie, oder: Lehren und Meinungen der originellsten Denker aller Zeiten über Gott und Religion, historisch dargestellt von Immanuel Berger, in: Neues theologisches Journal, Jg. 1803, 525-538
- Ueber die Idee und bisherige Behandlung einer Geschichte der Menschheit, in: Neue Leipziger Literaturzeitung, Erster Band, 1804, 1-8, 17-32, 49-60, 65-72
- Historischer Nachtrag zu der Abhandlung über die Idee und Behandlung der Geschichte der Menschheit, in: Neue Leipziger Literaturzeitung, Erster Band, 1804, 401-412
- [Review of] J. F. Herbart, De Platonici Systematis fundamento commentatio, in: Neue Leipziger Literaturzeitung, Dritter Band, 113. Stück, 30. August 1805, 1804-1806
- M. Karl Christoph Nestler, Pastor Primarius und Schul-Inspector in Bauzen, in: F. Schlichtegroll (Hrsg.), Nekrolog der Teutschen für das neunzehnte Jahrhundert, Fünfter Band, Gotha 1806, 1-76
- Wörterbücher der Philosophie, in: Neue Leipziger Literaturzeitung, 22. Stück, 17. Februar 1806, 337-352; 23. Stück, 19. Februar 1806, 353-358 [Reviews]
- Eingang zu einem Cursus der Psychologie. Gesprochen beim Anfange der Wintervorlesung im Jahr 1806, in: Der Neue Teutsche Merkur vom Jahr 1808, Zweiter Band, 267-281
- Ueber Glauben an Vervollkommnung und geistige Fortdauer. Eine Vorlesung, gehalten d. 27. April 1806, in: Der Neue Teutsche Merkur vom Jahr 1809, Zweiter Band, 176-201

Note: Carus wrote his reviews for the Neues theologisches Journal anonymously, using the signature "Hld". His contributions to the Magazin für Religions- Moral und Kirchengeschichte by Karl Friedrich Stäudlin and the Hellenica by Karl Gottfried Siebelis have yet to be identified.
