= John Mitchell Kemble =

English scholar and historian (1807–1857)

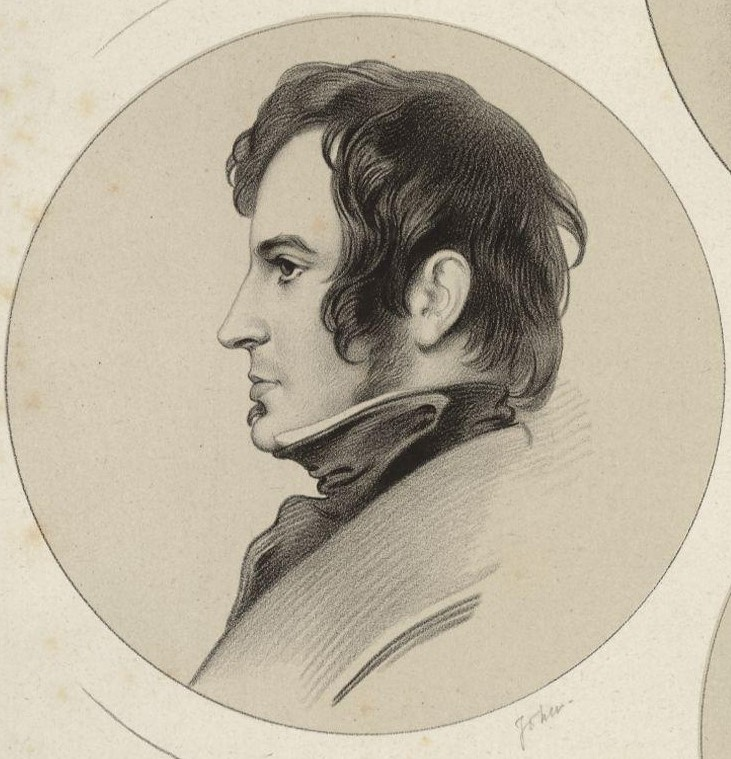
- Lithograph portrait miniature of John Mitchell Kemble in 1841 (age 34) from a family series by Richard James Lane.
- Born: 2 April 1807
- Died: 26 March 1857 (aged 49)
- Occupations: Medievalism, Philology

Academic background
- Education: Trinity College, Cambridge

Academic work
- Discipline: History, Philology
- Sub-discipline: Anglo Saxon Studies
- Website: https://dk.robinson.cam.ac.uk/

John Mitchell Kemble (2 April 1807 – 26 March 1857), English scholar and historian, was the eldest son of Charles Kemble the actor and Maria Theresa Kemble. He is known for his major contribution to the history of the Anglo-Saxons and philology of the Old English language, including one of the first translations of Beowulf.

Anglo-Saxon charters are often referred to by the 'Kemble' or 'KCD' (e.g. Kemble Codex Diplomaticus) numbers.

== Education ==
Kemble received his education from Charles Richardson and at Bury St Edmunds grammar school, where he obtained in 1826 an exhibition to Trinity College, Cambridge, where he became a member of the Cambridge Apostles. As a law student, his historical essays were well received but he "would not follow the course of study prescribed by the university and was, moreover, fond of society and of athletic amusements", which caused the deferral of his graduation in 1829. His Bachelor of Arts degree was granted in March 1830, and his M.A. degree three years later in March 1833.

== Anglo-Saxon studies ==
Kemble concentrated on Anglo-Saxon England, through the influence of Jacob Grimm, under whom he studied at Göttingen (1831). He published Anglo-Saxon Poems of Beowulf (1833–1837), Über die Stammtafeln der Westsachsen (Munich 1836), Codex diplomaticus aevi Saxonici (London 1839–1848), and made many contributions to reviews; his History of the Saxons in England (1849; new ed. 1876) was based on original sources for the early period of English history.

Kemble's "literal" Beowulf translation was entirely in prose.

Grendel reaches Heorot: Beowulf 710–714
Old English verse
Kemble's prose

Ðá cóm of móre | under misthleoþum
Grendel gongan· | godes yrre bær·
mynte se mánscaða | manna cynnes
sumne besyrwan | in sele þám héan·

Then under veils of mist came Grendel*
from the moor; he bare God's anger,
the criminal meant to entrap some one
of the race of men in the high hall.

* The prose does not attempt to follow the original's order in words or phrases.

He was editor of the British and Foreign Review from 1835 to 1844; and from 1840 to his death was Examiner of Plays. In 1857 he published State Papers and Correspondence Illustrative of the Social and Political State of Europe from the Revolution to the Accession of the House of Hanover.

His Horae Ferales, or Studies in the Archaeology of Northern Nations was completed by Robert Gordon Latham, and published in 1864.

== Marriage and death ==
Kemble married Nathalie Auguste, daughter of Amadeus Wendt of the University of Göttingen, in about 1836. They had two daughters and a son, but the marriage was not a happy one and they were living apart by about 1850. The elder daughter, Gertrude (b. 1837) married Sir Charles Santley, the singer, and died in 1882.

Kemble died at Dublin on 26 March 1857 and is buried there in Mount Jerome Cemetery.

== Notable works ==
- Kemble, John Mitchell (1837). A Translation of the Anglo-Saxon Poem of Beowulf. London: William Pickering.
- Kemble, John Mitchell (1839). Codex diplomaticus aevi saxonici. Vol. 1. London: Sumptibus Societatis. Covers numbers 1-240.
- Kemble, John Mitchell (1840). Codex diplomaticus aevi saxonici. Vol. 2. London: Sumptibus Societatis. Covers numbers 241-527.
- Kemble, John Mitchell (1845). Codex diplomaticus aevi saxonici. Vol. 3. London: Sumptibus Societatis. Covers numbers 528-726.
- Kemble, John Mitchell (1846). Codex diplomaticus aevi saxonici. Vol. 4. London: Sumptibus Societatis. Covers numbers 727-981.
- Kemble, John Mitchell (1847). Codex diplomaticus aevi saxonici. Vol. 5. London: Sumptibus Societatis. Covers numbers 982-1217.
- Kemble, John Mitchell (1848). Codex diplomaticus aevi saxonici. Vol. 6. London: Sumptibus Societatis. Covers numbers 1218-1369.
- Kemble, John Mitchell (1849). The Saxons in England: a history of the English Commonwealth till the period of the Norman Conquest. Longman.

== See also ==
- Walter de Gray Birch
- Peter Sawyer
- List of Anglo-Saxon charters
