= Anglo-Saxon charters =

Documents dealing with Anglo-Saxon legal affairs

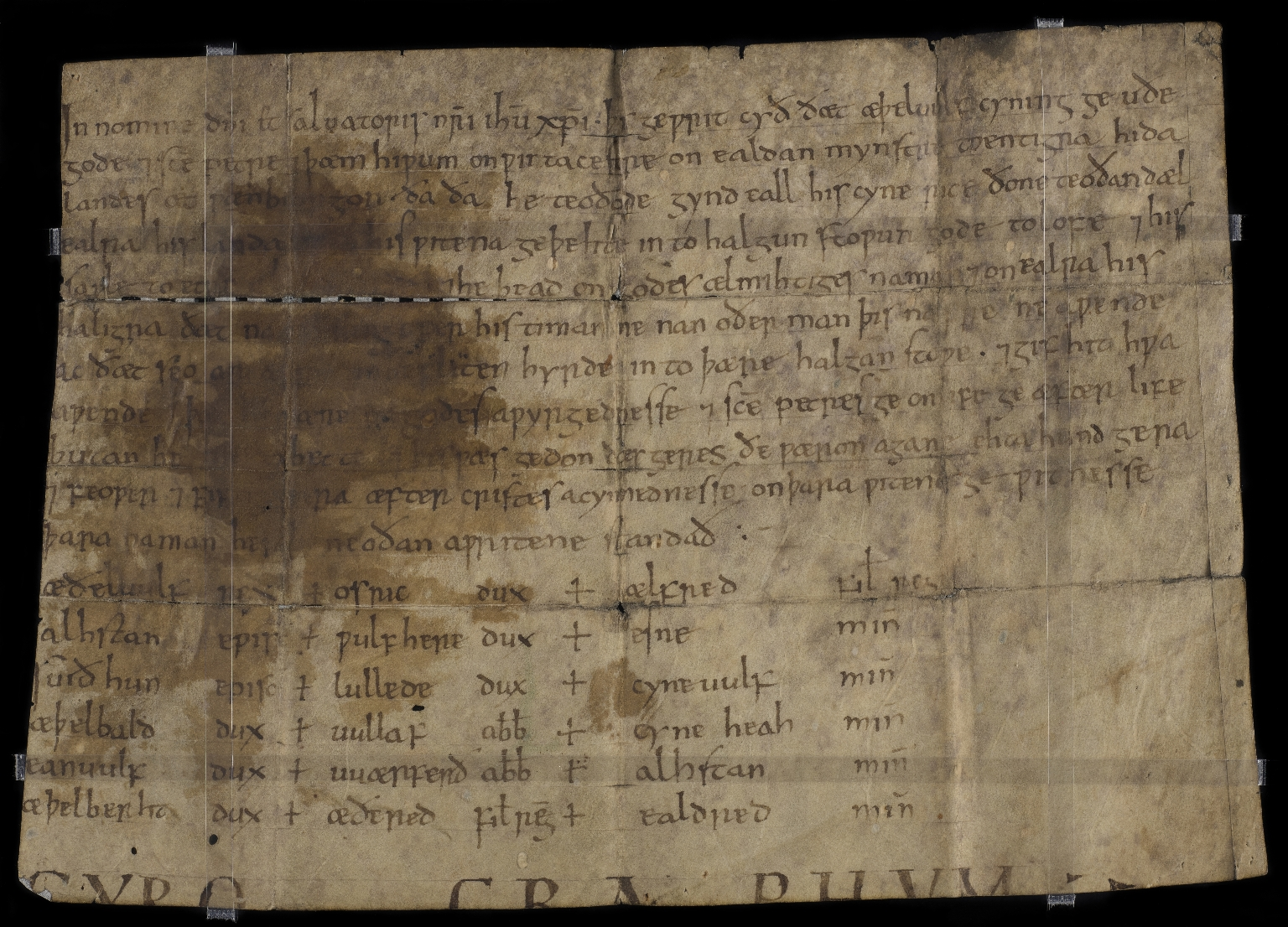
Likely 11th-century copy of AD 854 Royal Charter issued by King Ethelwulf granting 20 hides of land to the monks of St. Peter at Winchester

Anglo-Saxon charters are documents from the early medieval period in England which typically made a grant of land or recorded a privilege. The earliest surviving charters were drawn up in the 670s: the oldest surviving charters granted land to the Church, but from the eighth century, surviving charters were increasingly used to grant land to lay people.

The term charter covers a range of written legal documentation, including diplomas, writs and wills. A diploma was a royal charter that granted rights over land or other privileges by the king, whereas a writ was an instruction (or prohibition) by the king which may have contained evidence of rights or privileges. Diplomas were usually written on parchment in Latin, but often contained sections in the vernacular, describing the bounds of estates, which often correspond closely to modern parish boundaries. The writ was authenticated by a seal and gradually replaced the diploma as evidence of land tenure during the late Anglo-Saxon and early Norman periods. Land held by virtue of a charter was known as bookland.

Charters have provided historians with fundamental source material for understanding Anglo-Saxon England, complementing the Anglo-Saxon Chronicle and other literary sources. They are catalogued in Peter Sawyer's Annotated List and are usually referred to in the specialist literature by their Sawyer number (e.g. S 407).

== Survival and authenticity ==
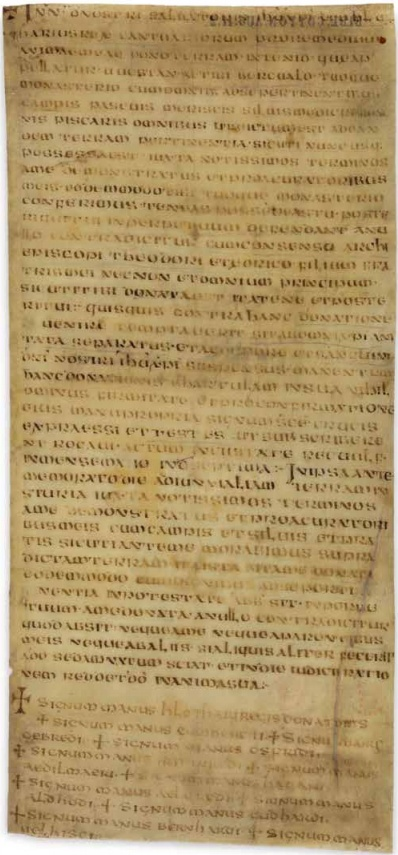
The oldest surviving Anglo-Saxon charter, issued by King Hlothhere of Kent in 679

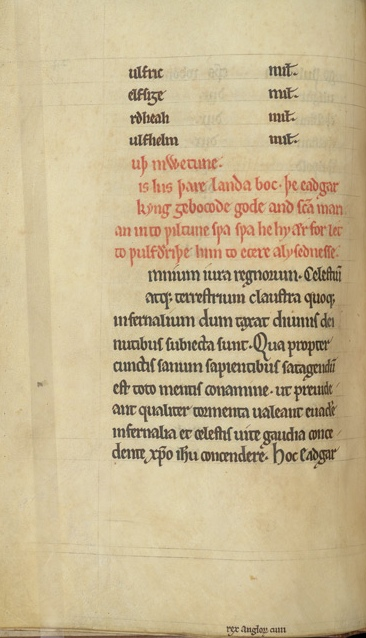
Copy of a 968 charter of King Edgar preserved in a mid-13th-century cartulary from Wilton Abbey

The Anglo-Saxon charter can take many forms: it can be a lease (often presented as a chirograph), a will, an agreement, a writ or, most commonly, a grant of land. Our picture is skewed towards those that regard land, particularly in the earlier period. Land charters can further be subdivided into royal charters, or diplomas, and private charters (donations by figures other than the king).

Over a thousand Anglo-Saxon charters are extant today, as a result of being maintained in the archives of religious houses. These preserved their charters so as to record their right to land. The oldest extant original charter, now in Canterbury Cathedral archive, was issued in 679 by King Hlothhere of Kent granting land to Reculver Abbey. Some surviving charters are later copies, which sometimes include interpolations.

Anglo-Saxon charters were sometimes used in legal disputes, and the recording of the contents of a charter within a legal document has ensured the survival of text when the original charter has been lost. Overall, some two hundred charters exist in the original form, whilst others are post-Conquest copies, that were often made by the compilers of cartularies (collections of title-deeds) or by early modern antiquaries. The earliest cartularies containing copies of Anglo-Saxon charters come from Worcester, early-11th-century Liber Wigorniensis and Hemming's Cartulary of a century later; a much later example, Wilton Cartulary, compiled in the mid-13th century at Wilton Abbey, still includes a significant amount of Anglo-Saxon material.

The importance of charters in legal disputes over land as evidence of land tenure, gave rise to numerous charter forgeries, sometimes by those same monastic houses in whose archives they were preserved. The primary motivation for forging charters was to provide evidence of rights to land. Often forging was focussed on providing written evidence for the holdings recorded as belonging to a religious house in the Domesday Book. It is important when studying charters to establish their authenticity. The study of charters to determine authenticity gave rise to diplomatics – the science of ancient documents.

Relatively few charters survive in their form as single sheets, and copies may have been altered for various purposes. Historians attempt to extract useful information from all types of charters, even outright fabrications, which may be of interest because they are apparently based on genuine documentation or for some other reason. Timothy Reuter, a specialist in German history, complained that "Anglo-Saxon diplomatists persist in the belief that it is possible to be slightly dead or slightly pregnant", but Simon Keynes argues that it is unhelpful to adopt the perspective of students of Continental charters, more of which survive as originals.

Anglo-Saxon charters are catalogued in Peter Sawyer's Annotated List (1968), revised and extended online. They are usually referred to in the specialist literature by their Sawyer number (e.g. S 407).

== Charter forms ==
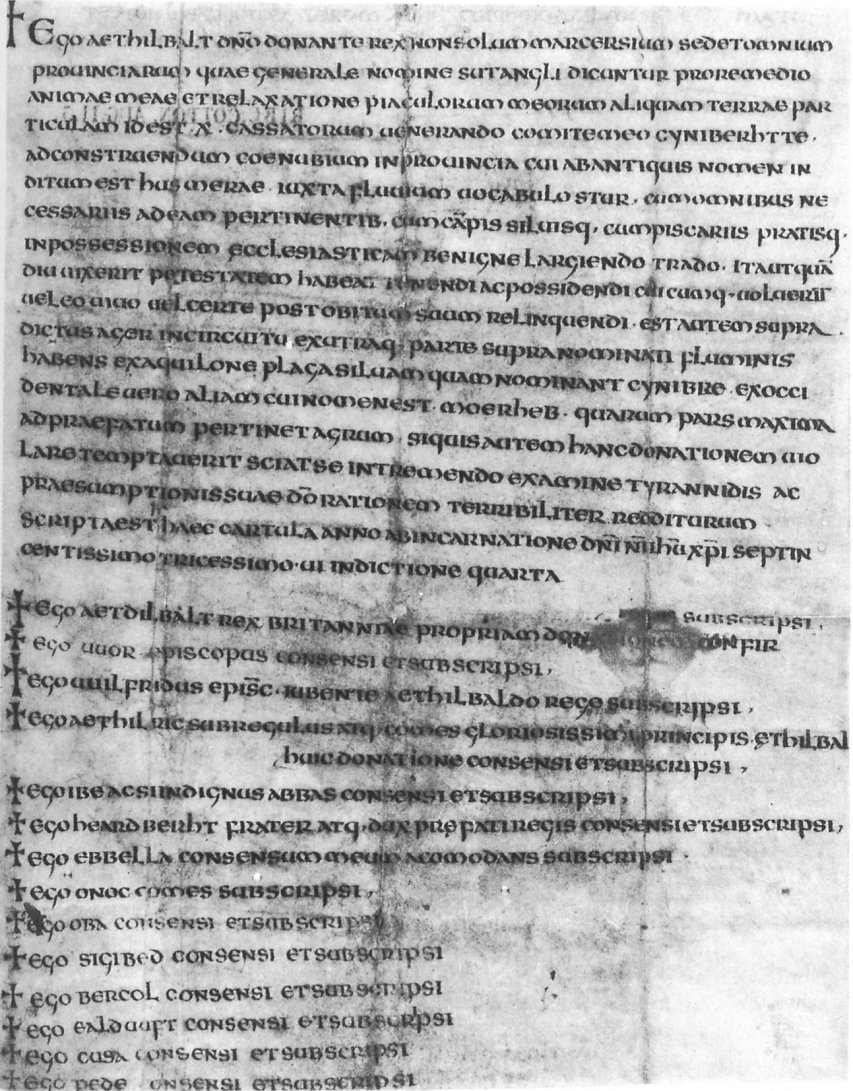
Ismere Diploma, a 736 charter of king Æthelbald of Mercia

The three most common forms of Anglo-Saxon charter are diplomas, writs and wills. They are certified by the attestations of witnesses, who are listed at the end of the charter.

=== Diplomas ===
The largest number of surviving charters are diplomas, or royal charters, that granted privileges and rights, usually over land. The typical diploma had three sections: protocol, corpus, and eschatocol. The protocol opened the charter by invoking God and enumerating the pious considerations for the King's act (proem). The corpus was usually in Latin and named the beneficiary, recorded the grant or transfer (dispositive clause), reserved common burdens (reservation clause) and invoked the wrath of God on anyone who failed to observe it (anathema or sanction). The corpus' final section, which was often in Old English, described the boundaries of the land (boundary clause). The eschatocol was composed of a dating clause and witness-list, which usually included powerful lay and ecclesiastical members of the king's court.

Much of the language of the diploma was explicitly religious – that a grant was made for the benefit of the grantor's soul or that anyone breaking the charter would be excommunicated. Charters typically opened by situating themselves firmly within the Christian order, with a pictorial (cross, chrismon or alpha-omega) and a verbal invocation to God. Many early charters were granted in anticipation of the founding of a monastery. The document served a largely secular purpose – to document the legal possession of land and to free that land from certain duties that would otherwise be attached to it.

=== Writs ===
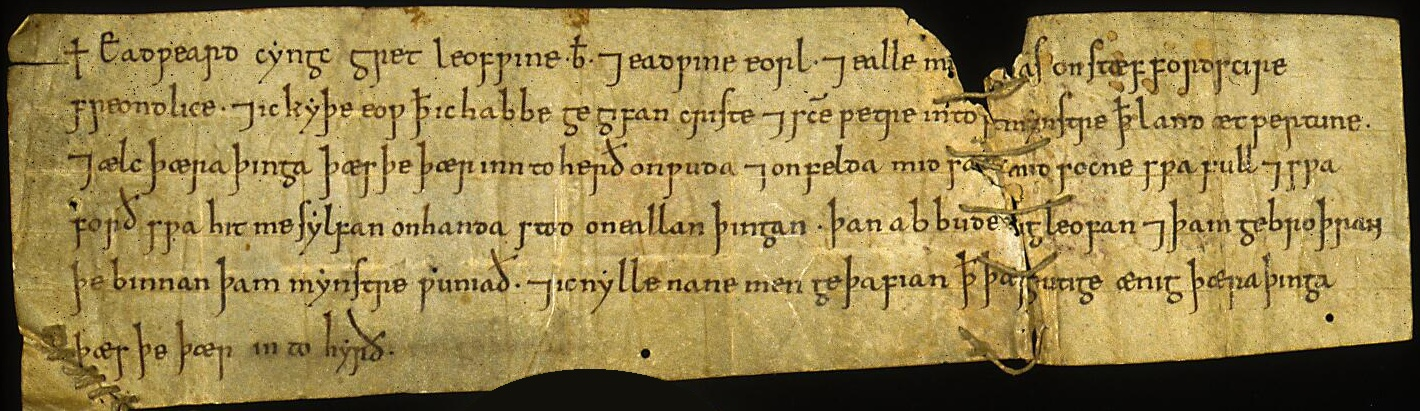
Writ of King Edward the Confessor granting land at Perton in Staffordshire to Westminster Abbey, 1062–1066

The second most common form of Anglo-Saxon charter, although far fewer in number than the diploma, is the royal writ. These differed from the diploma in both form and function. A writ was an instruction from the king to a named official or group of recipients. It started with a greeting and was authenticated by a royal seal. The writ did not require witnesses and was often written in Old English. Under the Normans, the use of writs was extended to cover many other aspects of royal business and was written in Latin. Florence Harmer provided the text (and translation when written in Old English) of 120 pre-Conquest royal writs.

=== Wills ===
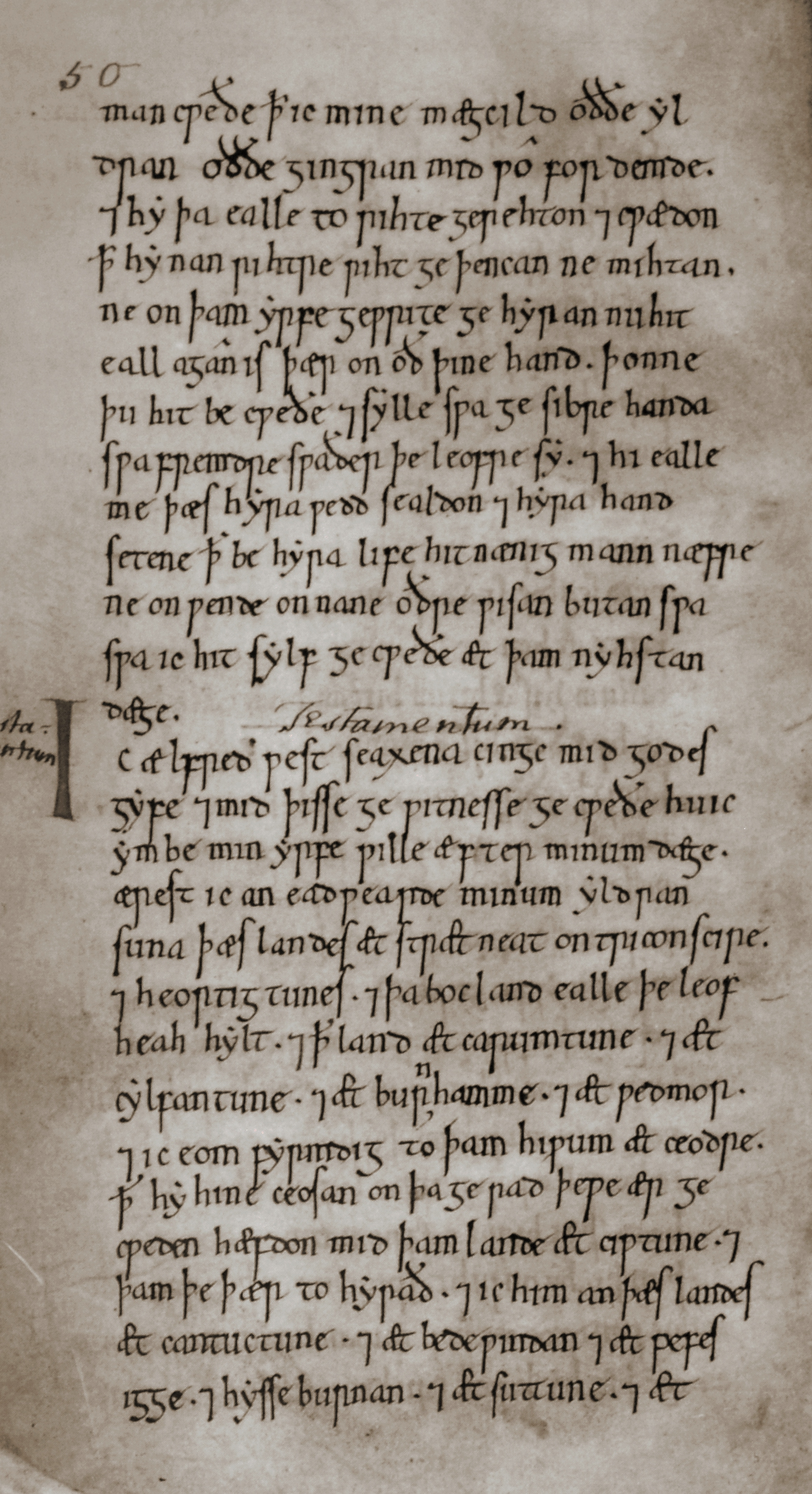
Opening page of Alfred the Great's will drawn up circa 885 (11th-century copy)

Anglo-Saxon wills were intended to make gifts of property (including land) after the writer's death, but they were not wills in the modern sense.

Wills are rarer than writs. The first dedicated study, Anglo-Saxon Wills by Dorothy Whitelock was able to identify 39 documents. The number grew to 55 with publication of another 16 among the Anglo-Saxon Charters by Agnes Jane Robertson in 1939. Since 1939, contributions to the list were few and far between; in her 2011 Wills and Will-making in Anglo-Saxon England Linda Tollerton published the most up-to-date corpus, with 68 examples in total. The surviving documents are very unevenly distributed both in time and space: from the 9th century, for example, only 9 wills are known, and 6 of them are in Canterbury. Not a single will from any period is known from further North than Burton upon Trent in Staffordshire. Furthermore, only 22 wills can be found in manuscripts written before 1066; originals are even rarer, as some, like those of Alfred the Great or Wulfric Spot, are known to be pre-Conquest copies, while still other may in fact be mere extracts or ancient forgeries.

Only two wills of kings have been preserved, those of Alfred and Eadred, both in later copies. Anglo-Saxon women whose wills survive include Wynflæd (mother of Ælfgifu of Shaftesbury and grandmother of Kings Eadwig and Edgar), King Edmund I's second wife Æthelflæd and her sister Ælfflæd.

== Boundary descriptions ==
A typical royal diploma had a clause describing the boundaries of the territory that is the subject of the charter. There are also boundary descriptions in a number of leases and two wills. In the earliest examples, these boundary descriptions are short, in Latin and with few boundary points. In time, the descriptions became longer, more detailed and written in Old English. By the end of the 9th century, all boundary clauses were written in Old English. Many charters, particularly those that have survived in later copies, do not have boundary clauses. In some instances, space has been left for a boundary clause that was never copied. A few boundary descriptions survive that do not appear to be related to any surviving charter.

The content of these boundary descriptions varied, but in many instances these descriptions revealed the Anglo-Saxons' ideas about their landscape.

Goodier (1984) demonstrated that it is unlikely that pre-existing land-units dictated the boundaries on Anglo-Saxon estates. The boundaries seem to have become increasingly stable during the early Anglo-Saxon period, and this explains why there are more 7th than 6th century burials on or close to them, which is not true of the 5th century. Goodier also made a geographic study of the estates of all charters in Sawyer's Annotated List.

== Historical significance ==
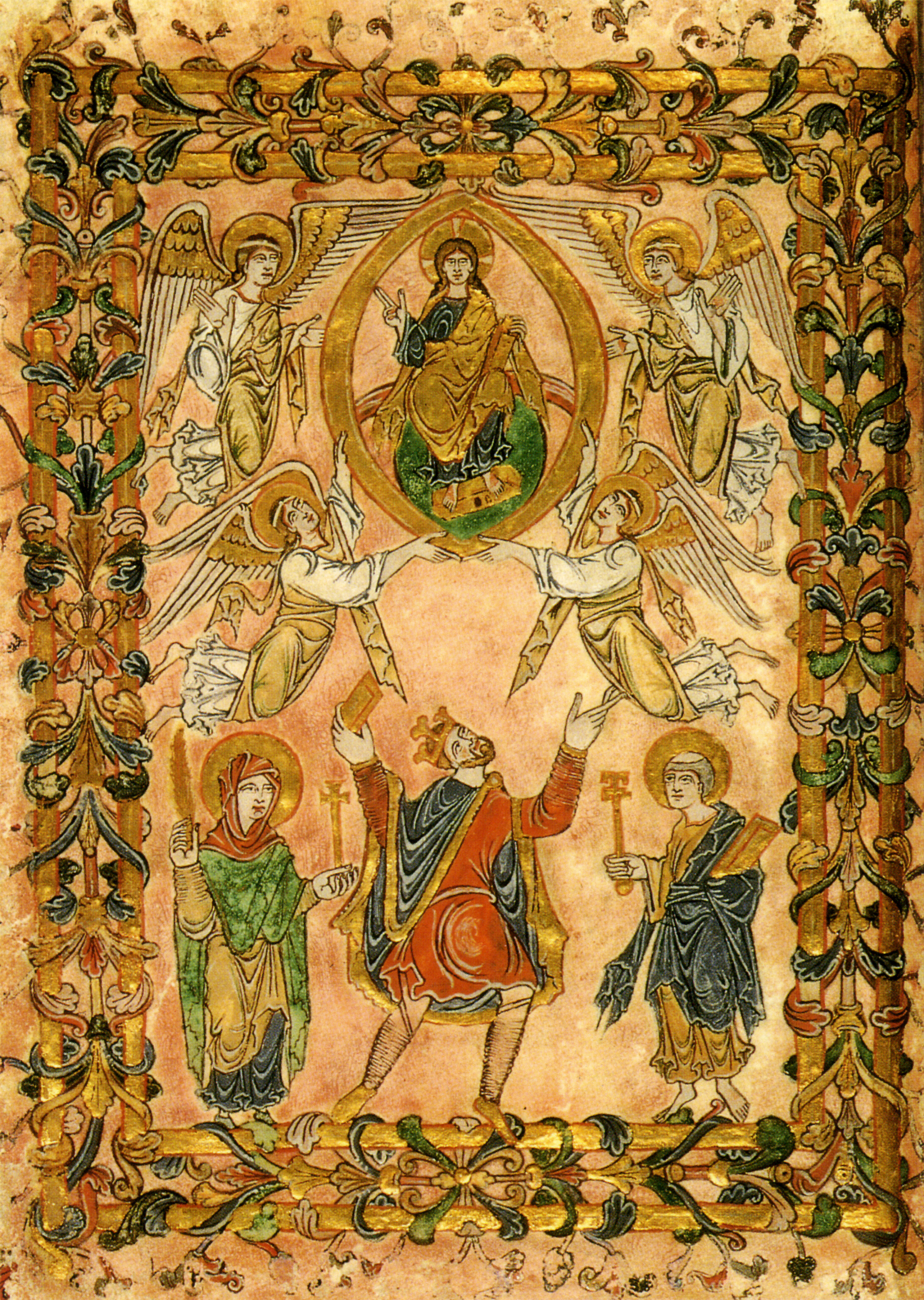
A page from the charter of Edgar to the New Minster, Winchester. S 745. Unusually, the charter is in the form of a book.

Charters have provided fundamental source material for understanding Anglo-Saxon England that complements the Anglo-Saxon Chronicle and other literary sources. They are often used by historians as sources for the history of Anglo-Saxon England. It was frequently kings who gave land in charters. By seeing what land was awarded, it is possible to see the extent of a king's control and how he exercised his power. In 846, Æthelwulf of Wessex granted land in Devon by charter, perhaps dividing the spoils from this recently conquered territory among his men.

It is possible to use charters to reconstruct models of ownership and land administration. For example, they provide an important basis for the discussion of early medieval Fenland. Some scholars employ charters to analyse Roman infrastructure and the relationship of early medieval inhabitants of Britain to the Roman past. The way these documents use Roman remains in and outside of boundary clauses can tell us a lot about how the past was understood and constructed.

Charters give lists of persons that attested the document and so it is possible to see who was present at the king's court. The very detailed diplomas drafted by the scribe known as "Æthelstan A" show that several Welsh kings, including Hywel Dda, attended the court of Æthelstan in the late 920s and the 930s. A person's absence from court can be equally revealing: Wulfstan I, Archbishop of York from 931 to 956, failed to attest any royal charters between 936 and 941, during which time the Battle of Brunanburh was fought between Æthelstan and an alliance of the Hiberno-Norse king of Dublin, Olaf Guthfrithson and the Scottish king, Constantine. Wulfstan was rather independently-minded, and his absence from the West Saxon court can be linked with possible participation at Brunanburh and his later activity as a kind of kingmaker in York. It is also possible to trace a man's career at court through his position in the witness list, as in the case of Eadric Streona at the court of Æthelred 'the Unready' in the early 11th century.

Burdens that were due by landowners to the king, such as providing soldiers, resources and man-power, were sometimes relieved in charters. This gives historians the opportunity to examine aspects of Anglo-Saxon society.

== Anglo-Saxon Charters (British Academy Series) ==
A joint committee of the British Academy and the Royal Historical Society was set up in 1966 to oversee a definitive edition of the entire corpus of Anglo-Saxon charters. The edition is to be published in approximately thirty volumes. The project chair is Professor Julia Crick. The following volumes have been published.:

1. Campbell, Alistair, ed. (1973). Charters of Rochester. Oxford University Press. ISBN 978-0-19-725936-8.
2. Sawyer, Peter H., ed. (1979). Charters of Burton Abbey. Oxford University Press. ISBN 978-0-19-725940-5.
3. O'Donovan, Mary A., ed. (1988). Charters of Sherborne. Oxford University Press. ISBN 978-0-19-726051-7.
4. Kelly, Susan E., ed. (1995). Charters of St Augustine's Abbey, Canterbury and Minster-in-Thanet. Oxford University Press. ISBN 978-0-19-726143-9.
5. Kelly, Susan E., ed. (1996). Charters of Shaftesbury Abbey. Oxford University Press. ISBN 978-0-19-726151-4.
6. Kelly, Susan E., ed. (1998). Charters of Selsey. Oxford University Press. ISBN 978-0-19-726175-0.
7. Kelly, Susan E., ed. (2000). Charters of Abingdon Abbey, Part 1. Oxford University Press. ISBN 978-0-19-726217-7.
8. Kelly, Susan E., ed. (2001). Charters of Abingdon Abbey, Part 2. Oxford University Press. ISBN 978-0-19-726221-4.
9. Miller, Sean, ed. (2001). Charters of the New Minster, Winchester. Oxford University Press. ISBN 978-0-19-726223-8.
10. Kelly, Susan E., ed. (2004). Charters of St Paul's, London. Oxford University Press. ISBN 978-0-19-726299-3.
11. Kelly, Susan E., ed. (2005). Charters of Malmesbury Abbey. Oxford University Press. ISBN 978-0-19-726317-4.
12. Crick, Julia, ed. (2007). Charters of St Albans. Oxford University Press. ISBN 978-0-19-726396-9.
13. Kelly, Susan E., ed. (2007). Charters of Bath and Wells. Oxford University Press. ISBN 978-0-19-726397-6.
14. Kelly, Susan E., ed. (2009). Charters of Peterborough Abbey. Oxford University Press. ISBN 978-0-19-726438-6.
15. Kelly, Susan E., ed. (2012). Charters of Glastonbury Abbey. Oxford University Press. ISBN 978-0-19-726507-9.
16. Woodman, David A., ed. (2012). Charters of Northern Houses. Oxford University Press. ISBN 978-0-19-726529-1.
17. Brooks, N. P.; Kelly, Susan E., eds. (2013). Charters of Christchurch, Canterbury, Part 1. Oxford University Press. ISBN 978-0-19-726535-2.
18. Brooks, N. P.; Kelly, Susan E., eds. (2013). Charters of Christchurch, Canterbury, Part 2. Oxford University Press. ISBN 978-0-19-726536-9.
19. Kelly, Susan E., ed. (2015). Charters of Chertsey Abbey. Oxford University Press. ISBN 978-0-19-726556-7.
20. Kelly, Susan E., ed. (2021). Charters of Barking Abbey and Waltham Holy Cross. Oxford University Press. ISBN 978-0-19-726688-5.

Supplementary volume

Keynes, Simon, ed. (1991). Facsimiles of Anglo-Saxon Charters. Oxford University Press. ISBN 978-0-19-726078-4.

== See also ==
- The Stowe manuscripts, which contain a series of Anglo-Saxon charters
- Anglo-Saxon Charters: an Annotated List and Bibliography
- List of Anglo-Saxon Charters
