= St John's Hall, Penzance =

Municipal building in Penzance, Cornwall, England

- Hel Sen Jowan (Cornish)
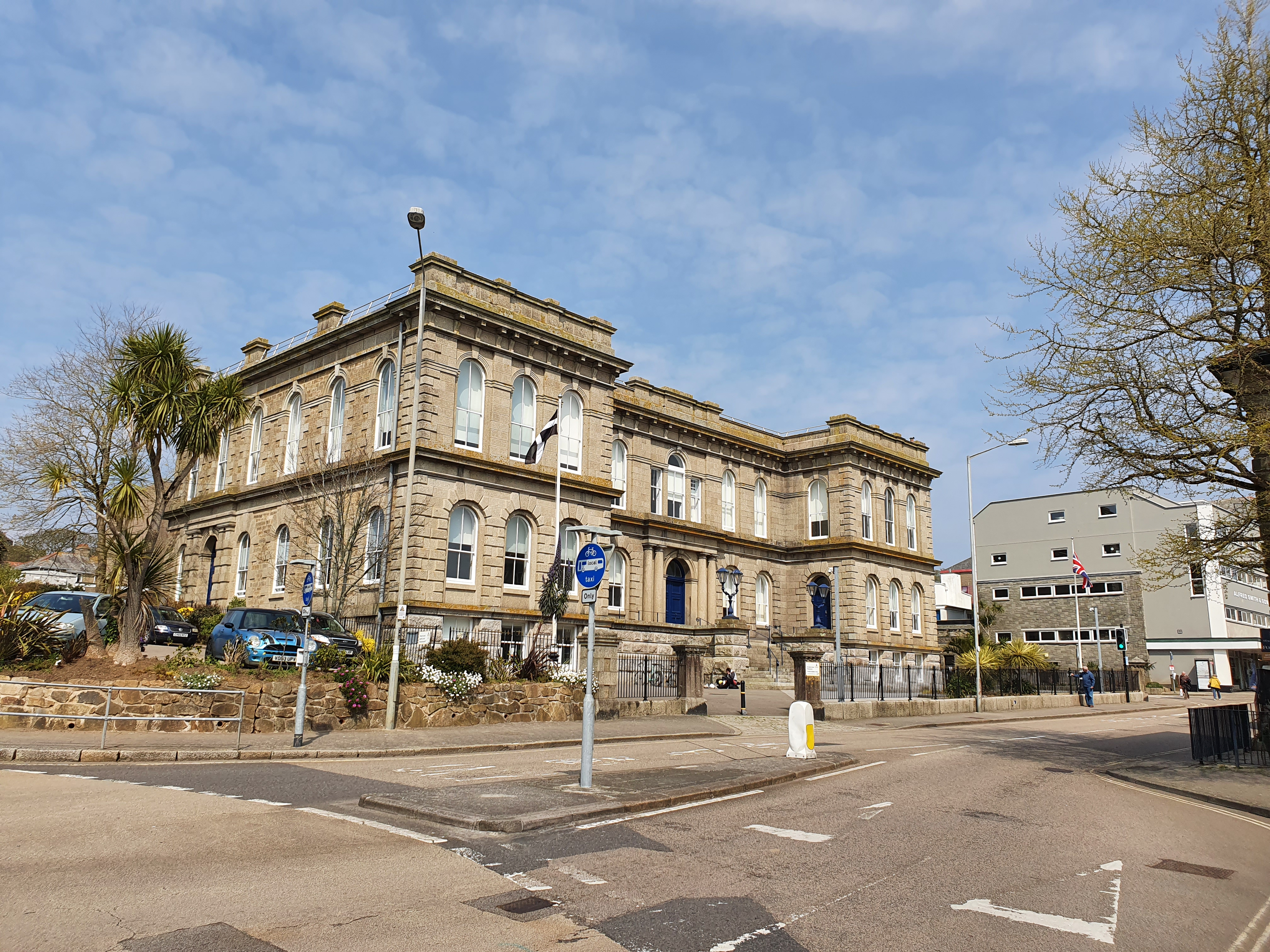
- St John's Hall

- Shown in Cornwall
- 50.1188°N 5.5403°W
- Location: Alverton Street, Penzance, Cornwall, England

History
- Built: 1867

Site notes
- Architect: John Matthews
- Architectural style: Neoclassical style

Listed Building – Grade II
- Official name: Public Buildings
- Designated: 29 July 1950
- Reference no.: 1143145

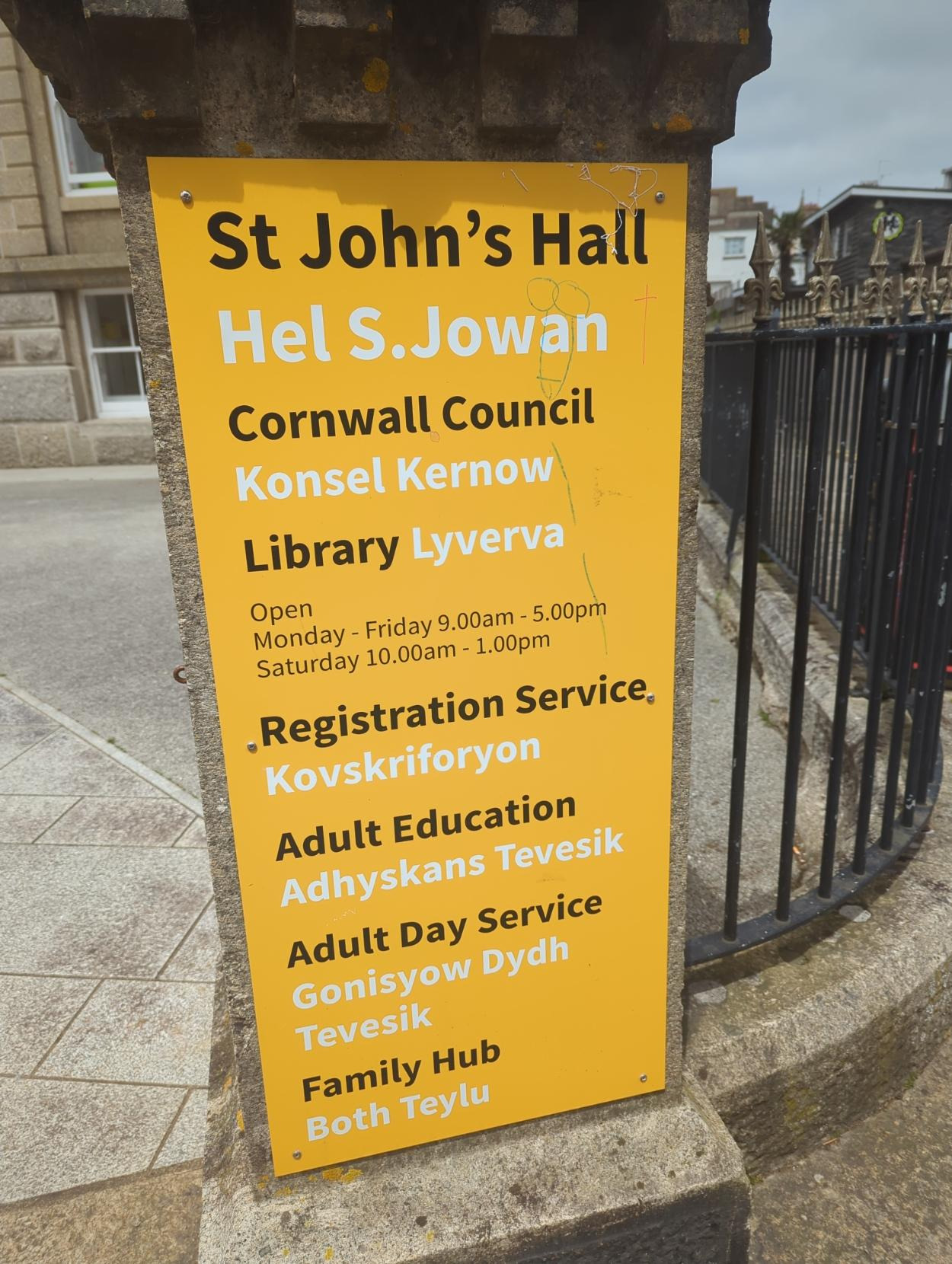
Bilingual signage outside St John's Hall

St John's Hall (Cornish: Hel Sen Jowan), formerly known as the Public Buildings, Penzance, is a municipal building in Alverton Street, Penzance, Cornwall, England. The structure, which was the headquarters of Penzance Borough Council, is a Grade II listed building.

== History ==
The first municipal building in Penzance was a market building in the Market Place which was built in the early 17th century. This was replaced by a new market building on the same site which was designed by William Harris and completed in 1838.

In the early 1860s, civic leaders decided that the town needed a dedicated municipal building: the site chosen was glebe land in Alverton Road some 200 metres (660 ft) to the west of the old market building. The plan was for the west wing to contain a geological museum managed by the Royal Geological Society of Cornwall, the east wing was to contain the municipal offices, the courtrooms and a police station while the central section was to contain the main assembly hall known as St John's Hall, a name which was eventually adopted locally for the whole complex.

Foundation stones for each of west and east wings, and the central section, of the new building were laid by Charles Fox, President of the Geological Society, the mayor of Penzance and the High Sheriff of Cornwall respectively on 27 April 1864. The complex was designed by John Matthews in the neoclassical style, built in ashlar stone from Lamorna Quarry by Olver & Sons of Falmouth and was officially opened on 10 September 1867. The design involved a symmetrical main frontage with eleven bays facing onto the Alverton Street with the end three bays on either side projected forward to form the wings; the central section of five bays featured a flight of steps leading up to a round headed doorway with a fanlight flanked by pairs of Doric order columns supporting an entablature. The top step, which was 18 feet (5.5 m) across, was formed by a single piece of granite. There was a central Venetian window on the first floor and round headed sash windows in the other bays all flanked by pilasters with brackets above supporting a cornice. A concert organ, designed and manufactured by Henry Bryceson, was installed in the main assembly hall, and the suffragette, Helen Beedy, give a speech in front of an audience of 600 people there in December 1874.

The building continued to serve as the headquarters of the borough council for much of the 20th century but ceased to be the local seat of government when the enlarged Penwith District Council was formed at St Clare in 1974. The west wing included the Geological Society's museum which was open from 1815 to 1985 when the ceiling collapsed, but after major funding for repairs and redisplay the new Cornwall Geology Museum was open until 2001 when further roof problems caused its closure, with the majority of the collection being moved to the British Geological Survey at Keyworth for curation and storage.

However, with the resurgence of the St Piran's Day celebrations since the 1950s and the revival of the annual Golowan Festival in 1991, the hall became the traditional starting point for the annual parades to celebrate these events in March and June each year respectively.

Following the completion of an extensive programme of refurbishment works, which included the conversion of the west wing into a public library and the conversion of the east wing into modern offices for the use of Cornwall Council staff delivering local services, the building was re-opened by the Duke and Duchess of Cornwall in July 2016.
