= Penzance =

Town in Cornwall, England

Coordinates: 50.119°N 5.537°W

Penzance: Cornish: Pennsans
- Town
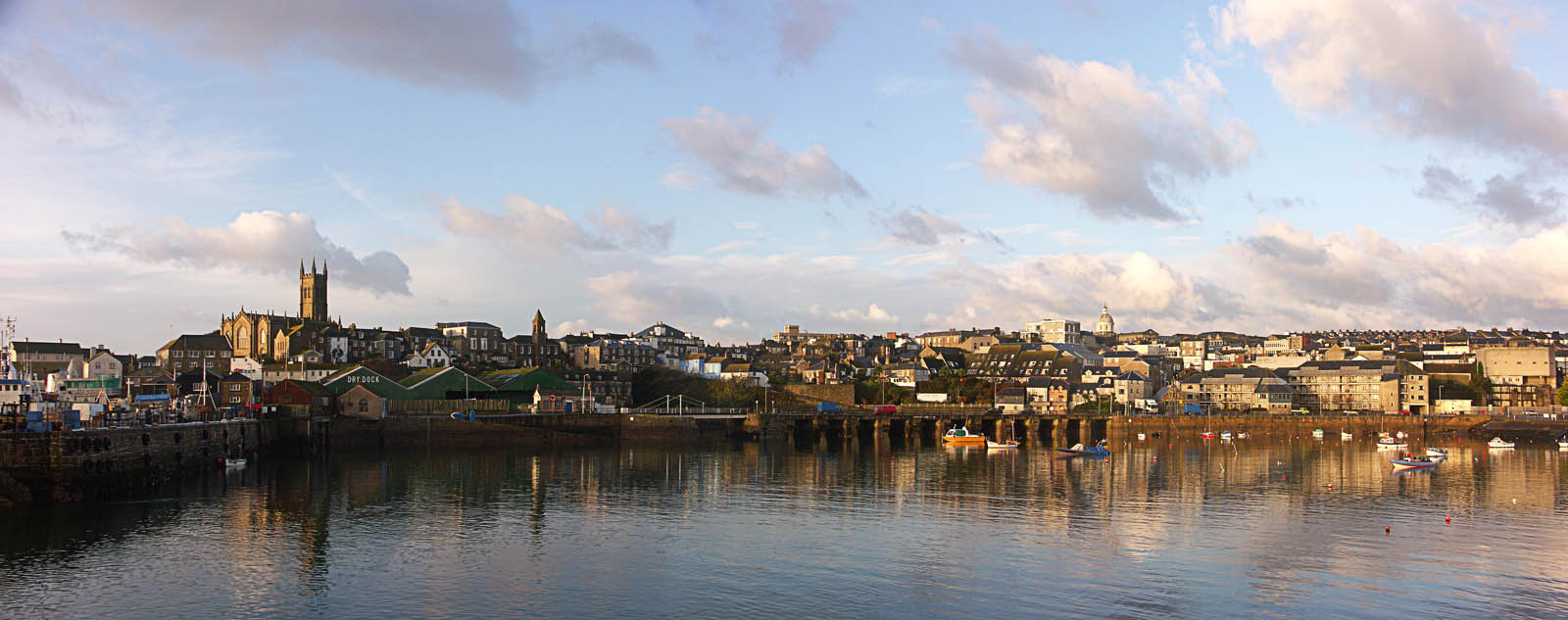
- A panorama of Penzance

- Location within Cornwall
- Population: 20,734 (Parish, 2021); 14,960 (Built up area, 2021)
- OS grid reference: SW475306
- Civil parish: Penzance
- Unitary authority: Cornwall
- Ceremonial county: Cornwall
- Region: South West
- Country: England
- Sovereign state: United Kingdom
- Post town: PENZANCE
- Postcode district: TR18
- Dialling code: 01736
- Police: Devon and Cornwall
- Fire: Cornwall
- Ambulance: South Western
- UK Parliament: St Ives
- Website: www.penzance-tc.gov.uk

Penzance (/pɛnˈzæns/ pen-ZANSS; Cornish: Pennsans [pɛnːsanz], meaning holy head) is a town, civil parish and port in Cornwall, England. It lies 64 miles (103 km) west-southwest of Plymouth, 255 miles (410 km) west-southwest of London, and 9 miles (14 km) east of Land's End. Penzance railway station is the terminus of the Cornish Main Line and is both the southernmost and westernmost station in England. Situated in the shelter of Mount's Bay, the town faces south-east onto the English Channel. As well as Penzance itself, the parish also includes the fishing port of Newlyn and the villages of Mousehole, Paul, Gulval, and Heamoor. At the 2021 census the population of the parish was 20,734 and the population of the Penzance built-up area as defined by the Office for National Statistics was 14,960.

Penzance was granted a market charter in 1404 and was formally incorporated as a borough in 1614. Chapel Street has a number of interesting features, including the Egyptian House, The Admiral Benbow public house (home to a 19th-century smuggling gang and allegedly the inspiration for Treasure Island's "Admiral Benbow Inn"), the Union Hotel (including a Georgian theatre which is no longer in use), and Branwell House, where the mother and aunt of the Brontë sisters once lived. Regency and Georgian terraces and houses are common in some parts of the town. The nearby sub-tropical Morrab Gardens has a large collection of tender trees and shrubs, many of which cannot be grown outdoors anywhere else in the UK. Also of interest is the seafront with its promenade and the open-air seawater Jubilee Pool, one of the oldest surviving Art Deco swimming baths in the country.

Penzance is the base of the pirates in Gilbert and Sullivan's comic opera The Pirates of Penzance. At the time the libretto was written in 1879, Penzance had become popular as a peaceful resort town, so the idea of it being overrun by pirates was amusing to contemporaries.

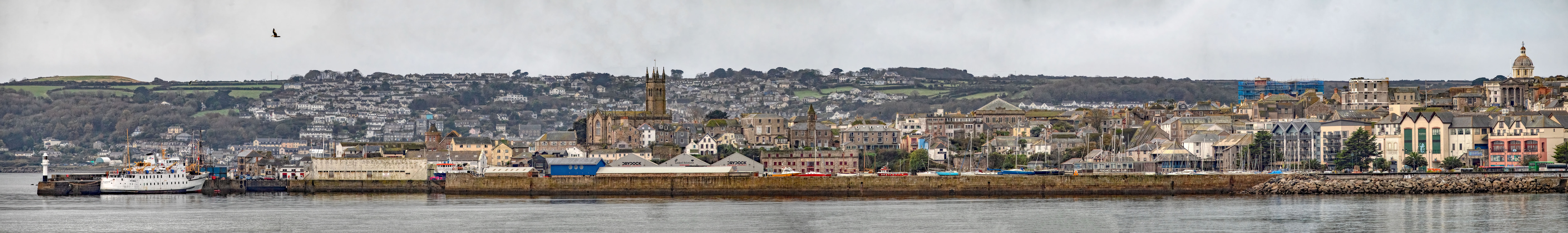
Penzance panorama

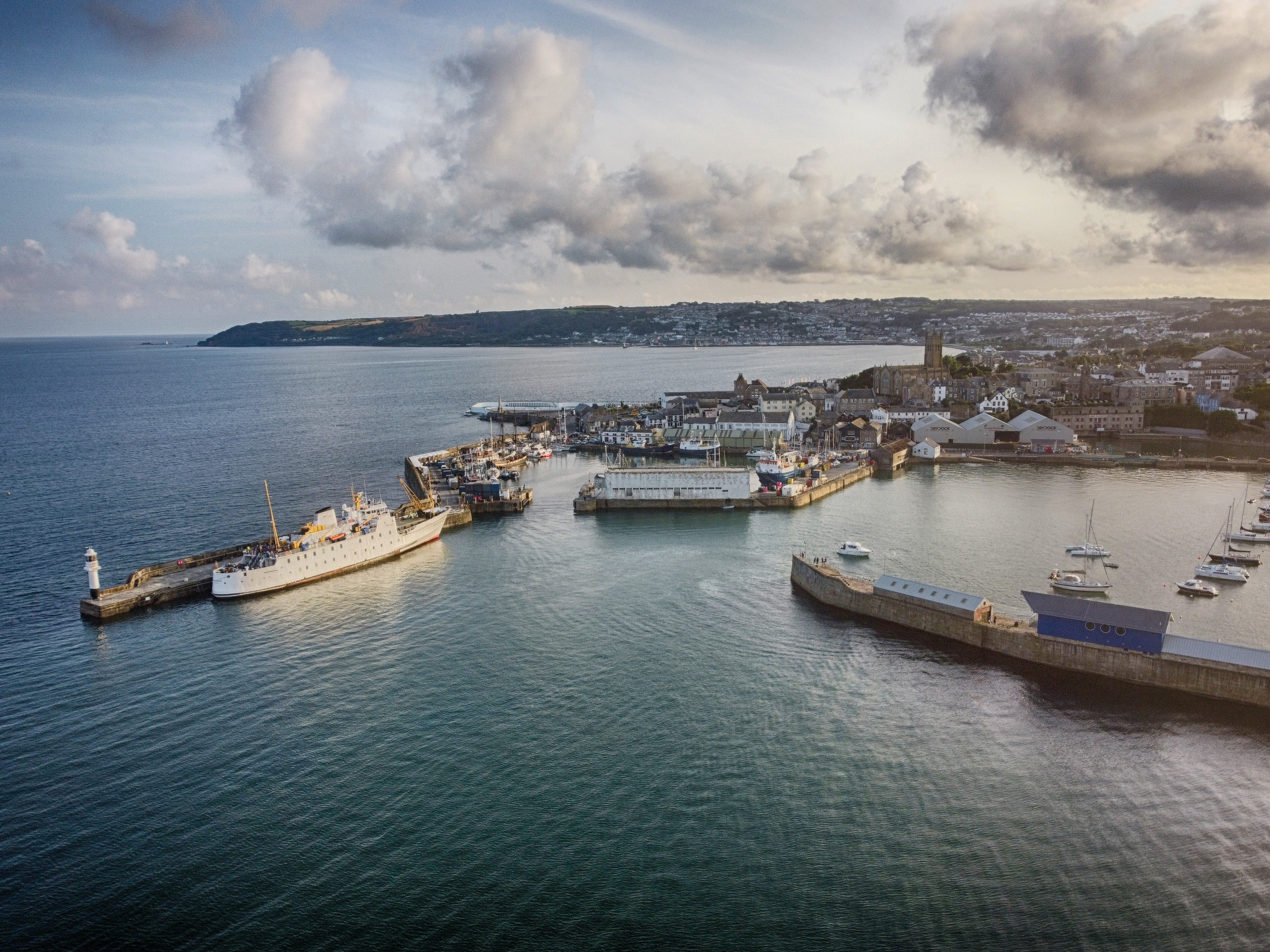
Penzance Harbour with Scillonian 3

== Toponymy ==
Penzance—Pennsans; "holy headland" in the Cornish language—refers to the location of a chapel nowadays called St Anthony's that is said to have stood over a thousand years ago on the headland to the west of what became Penzance Harbour. There are no early documents mentioning an actual dedication to St Anthony which seems to depend entirely on tradition and may be groundless. The only remaining object from this chapel is a carved figure, now largely eroded, known as "St Raffidy" which can be found in the churchyard of the parish church of St Mary's near the original site of the chapel. Until the 1930s this history was also reflected in the choice of symbol for the town, the severed "holy head" of St John the Baptist. His head is shown on the civic regalia of the Mayor of Penzance and on the northern side of the Market House in the town.

== History ==
=== Prehistory to Early Medieval period ===
About 400 prehistoric stone axes, known as Group 1 axes and made from greenstone, have been found all over Britain, which from petrological analysis appear to come from west Cornwall. Although the quarry has not been identified, it has been suggested that the Gear, a rock now submerged half a mile from the shore at Penzance, may be the site. A significant amount of trade is indicated as many have been found elsewhere in Britain. The earliest evidence of settlement in Penzance is from the Bronze Age. A number of bronze implements such as a palstave, a spear-head, a knife, and pins, along with much pottery and large quantities of charcoal were discovered when building a new housing estate, at Tredarvah, to the west of Alverton. The defensive earthwork known as Lescudjack Castle is not excavated, but almost certainly belongs to the Iron Age. A single rampart encloses three acres of hilltop, and would have dominated the approach to the area from the east. There are no signs of the additional ramparts reported by William Hals in about 1730, and the site is now surrounded by housing with allotments. Excavations in 2008, 1 kilometre (0.62 mi) to the west at Penwith College found an enclosure ditch and pottery indicating a settlement, and an evolving field system with ditches and interconnecting pits suggesting water management. There are traces of a rampart and ditch to the west of Penzance at Mount Misery, and an oval rampart and ditch at Lesingey above the St Just road, which together with Lescudjack, overlook the coast of Penzance and Newlyn.

Until recently, there was little evidence for anything but an early and short Roman occupation of Cornwall, and there have so far been only three finds in Penzance. In August 1899 two coins of Vespasian (69–79 AD) were found in an ancient trench in Penzance Cemetery. The coins were eight feet below ground together with some cow bones, and are now in the Penlee House Museum. Another coin, found in 1934 in the Alverton area, depicts Sol, the Roman sun god. It is described as a ″coin of the reign of Constantine the Great″, and was also donated to the museum. A 30 mm (1 3/16 in) sestertius was found on a building site in or around Penzance about ten years previously, and was presented to the Royal Institution of Cornwall. Larger quantities of Roman coins have been found nearby, at Marazion Marsh and Kerris in Paul parish, but there is no evidence of any Roman settlement in the area, although nearby villages such as Chysauster were occupied at this time.

The Hundred of Penwith had its ancient centre at Connerton, now buried beneath the sands of Gwithian Towans at Gwithian. The Manor of Alverton, with an area of 64 Cornish acres, gave its name to the second largest tithing in Penwith. The manor included Penzance as well as parts of Madron, Paul, St Buryan and Sancreed.

Although Penzance is not mentioned in the survey document the Domesday Book, it is likely that the area would have been included. Domesday records that in 1066 the Manor of Alwarton was owned by Alward who was dispossessed by Robert, Count of Mortain, a half-brother of William the Conqueror. The name Alward and tun, a personal name combined with a town or settlement suffix, indicate Saxon land ownership. In Cornwall the tun indicates a manorial centre such as Helston or Connerton. The change of ownership in 1066 was a change from one alien landlord to another, and the name Alverton lives on as the western part of Penzance from St John's Hall, to the housing estate on the west side of the River Laregan.

=== High and Late Middle Ages ===
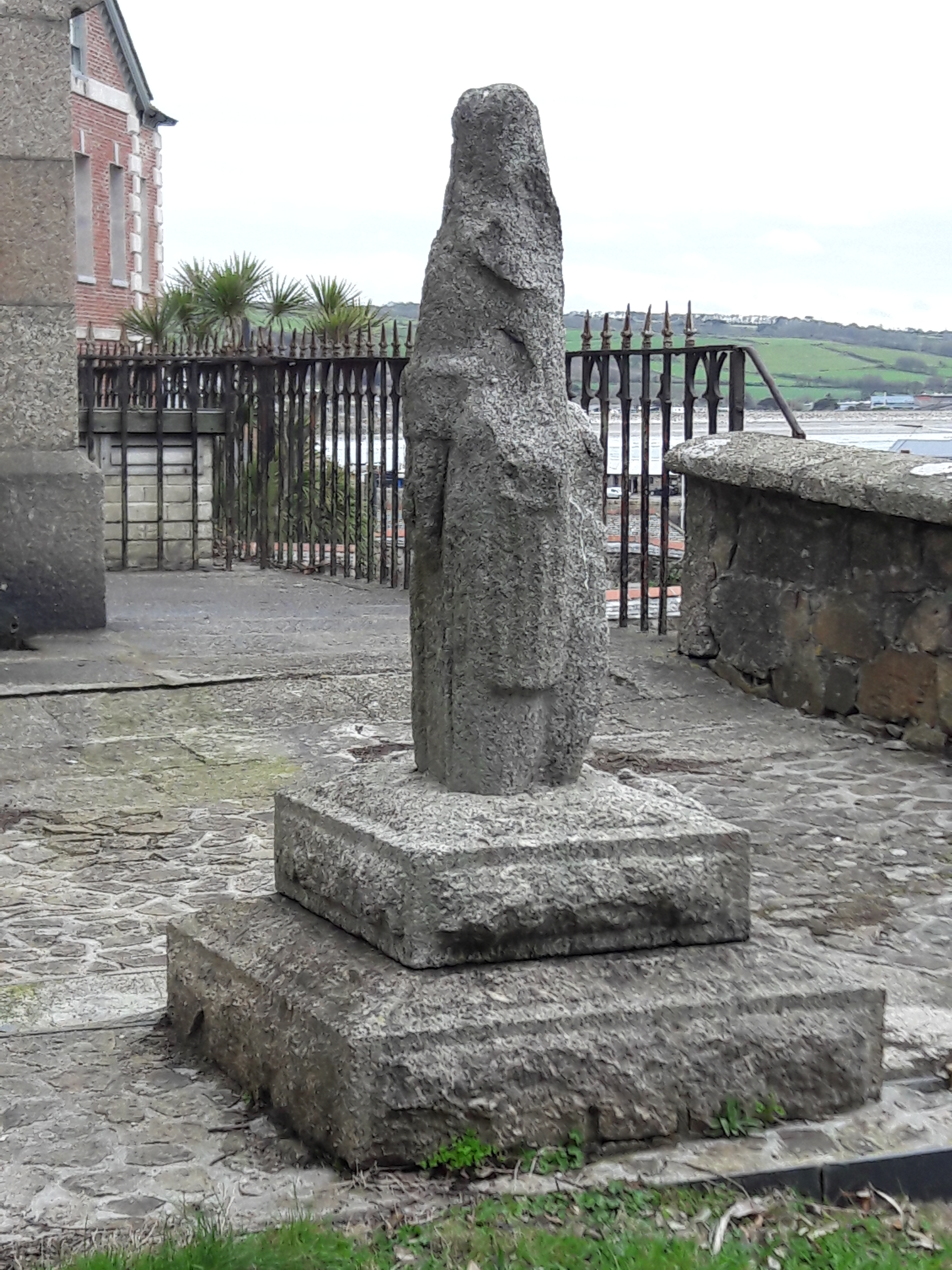
The stone in the churchyard known as St Raffidy

The first mention of the name Pensans is in the Assize Roll of 1284, and the first mention of the actual church that gave Penzance its name is in a manuscript written by William Borlase in 1750: ″The ancient chapel belonging to the town of Penzance may be seen in a fish cellar, near the key; it is small and as I remember had the image of the Virgin Mary in it.″ The chapel was built of greenstone and about 30 ft in length and 15 ft in breadth of which only a fragment remained in situ. In around 1800 the chapel was converted to a fish cellar. A carving in "Ludgvan granite" thought to be of St Anthony was removed in about 1830 and was used in the wall of a pig sty, which was further vandalised in 1850 when "a stranger ... taking fancy to the stony countenance and rough hands, they were broken off and carried away as relics ...". The remains of the vandalised relic were taken to St Mary's Churchyard by a mason who told Mr Millett that he "popped St Raffidy into a wheelbarrow and trundle him off to the chapel yard." The carving remains in St Mary's Churchyard and has been dated by Prof Charles Thomas as early 12th century. There are no early documents mentioning the dedication to St Anthony; this seems to depend entirely on tradition and may be groundless. A licence for Divine Service in the Chapel of St Gabriel and St Raphael was granted in 1429, but nothing more is known of this chapel except, possibly, for the mason who mentioned ″St Raffidy″ in 1850. Adjoining the chapel is St Anthony's Gardens, named in 1933 and containing an archway said to have been taken from the chapel site.

Dominating the skyline above the harbour is the present church of St Mary's. A St Mary's Chapel is mentioned in a 1548 document which states that it was founded by Sir Henry Tyes, Knight, Lord of the Manor of Alverton, who gave a £4 stipend for a priest. There is an earlier document from 1379, when Bishop Brantyngham licensed for services "the chapel of Blessed Mary of Pensande". At this date it was a chapel of ease to the parish church at Madron. Further evidence of historical settlement from this period is in the St Clare area of the town, where a chapel existed to St Clare or Cleer. The earliest reference is a lease of 1584: "...a certain chapel situate below the high road between Pensaunce and Madderne." In the early part of the 19th century the foundations of a building, said to be the chapel, was discovered, and enough was exposed to show the shape of the building. An episcopal licence cannot be traced for this chapel. The name, St Clare, lives on in the town as "St Clare Street", which is part of the road from Penzance to Madron, and the St Clare cricket ground at the top of the hill.

Medieval economy

Markets were held on a fixed day each week, and fairs on fixed date(s) each year. To obtain either, a manorial lord had to apply for a royal charter. The right to hold a market each Wednesday was granted by King Edward III to Alice de Lisle, sister of Lord Tyes and widow of Warin de Lisle, on 25 April 1332; a fair, lasting seven days at the Feast of St Peter ad Vincula on 1 August; and another fair of seven days on 24 August at Mousehole for the feast of St Bartholomew – later to be held in Penzance. The settlement was growing in importance as the weekly Wednesday market was confirmed by King Henry IV and three further fairs, each of two days, were granted on 8 April 1404. These were at the Feast of the Conception of Virgin Mary (8 December), St Peter in Cathedra (22 February) and the Nativity of the Virgin Mary (8 September).

It is not known when a quay was built at Penzance as there is no grant or licence, but an Inquest as to the Manor of Alverton in 1322 records eight fishing boats each paying 2 shillings each, and an unspecified number at Mousehole each paying 12 shillings. There was also a payment of 8 shillings for the rent of logii (huts or sheds) of foreign fishermen, i.e. those outside the manor. At a second Inquest in 1327 the number had risen to 13 at Penzance; with 16 recorded at Mousehole and both now paying only 1 shilling each: the total rent for logii was 8s 6d (42 1/2p) with 17 tenants paying 6d (2 1/2p) each. Both Inquests record 29 burgesses at Penzance and 40 at Mousehole. A burgess paid his rent with money rather than with personal services, and this indicates that Penzance and Mousehole were considered to be towns. A comparison of the settlements in West Cornwall can be made with the annual payments, based on the number of fishing boats, made to the Duchy of Cornwall in 1337: Porthia (St Ives) £6; Mosehole (Mousehole) £5; Marcasion (Marazion) £3; Pensanns (Penzance) 12s (60p); Londeseynde (Land's End), (Sennen Cove) 10s (50p); Nywelyn (Newlyn) 10s; and Portmynster (Porthminster, St Ives) 2s (10p). In 1425, 1432 and 1440 ships in Penzance were licensed to carry pilgrims to the shrine of St James of Compostella, in north-west Spain.

In medieval times and later, Penzance was subject to frequent raiding by "Turkish pirates", in fact Barbary Corsairs. Throughout the period before Penzance gained borough status in 1614 the village and surrounding areas continued to be within the control of the Manor of Alverton and was subject to the taxation regime of that manor.

=== Early modern period ===
==== Tudor period ====
In the summer of 1578 Penzance was visited by the plague. The burial registers of Madron (where all Penzance births, deaths and marriages were recorded) shows a massive increase in deaths for 1578, from 12 the previous year to 155. This is estimated to be about 10% of the population of the village at the time. The plague also returned in 1647 and the registers again show an increase of from 22 burials to 217 in one year.

Being at the far west of Cornwall, Penzance and the surrounding villages have been sacked many times by foreign fleets. On 23 July 1595, several years after the Spanish Armada of 1588, a Spanish force of four galleys transporting 400 arquebusiers under Don Carlos de Amesquita, which had been patrolling the Channel, landed troops in Cornwall. The local militias, which formed the cornerstone of their anti-invasion measures and numbered several hundred men, threw down their arms and fled in panic. Only Francis Godolphin, Deputy Lord Lieutenant of Cornwall and commander of the militias along with 12 of his soldiers stood to offer some kind of resistance. Amesquita's force seized supplies, raided and burned Penzance and surrounding villages, held a mass, and sailed away to successfully engage and put to flee a Dutch squadron of 46 ships.

==== Penzance as a town since 1614 ====
The reason for Penzance's relative success probably stems from the 15th, 16th and 17th centuries when King Henry IV granted the town a royal market in 1404. Henry VIII in 1512 granted the right to charge harbour dues, and King James I granted the town the status of a Borough in 1614. The charter defined the bounds of the town as being the area within a half-mile radius from the market cross in the Greenmarket. The charter gave the town the right to hold certain courts, own land and property, impose fines for breaking bylaws, and to provide a prison. The charter also confirmed the harbour rights given earlier in 1512 and granted two weekly markets to be held on Tuesdays and Thursday, which replaced a single market previously held on Wednesdays. Seven fairs were granted (or confirmed):

- Corpus Christi, the Sunday after Whitsun – still held
- The Thursday before St Andrew's Day (30 November)
- St Peter's Day (1 August); first granted in 1332
- St Bartholomew's Day (24 August); originally granted to Mousehole but now obsolete probably due to the Spanish Raid of 1595
- St Mary the Virgin's Day (8 September); granted in 1404
- The Conception of St Mary the Virgin's Day (8 September); granted in 1404
- St Peter's Day in Cathedra (22 February); granted in 1404

The Crown was paid a perpetual rent of five marks (£3 6s 8d / £3.33) in acknowledgment of the rights granted by the Charter, which was paid until 1832, but there was no grant of Parliamentary representation.

The old arms of Penzance were the head of St John the Baptist on a charger, with the legend "Pensans anno Domini 1614". The arms of the borough are Arg. a Paschal lamb proper in base a Maltese cross Az. on a chief embattled of the last between two keys in saltire wards upwards Or and a saltire couped Arg. a plate charged with a dagger point downwards Gu.

Within a year the new Borough bought a "substantial degree of freedom" from the Manor of Alverton then known as Alverton and Penzance for £34 plus a perpetual annuity of £1 which was last paid in 1936. A market-house and Guildhall was built, and together with the rights bought in 1615, provided almost all the borough income for more than two centuries. The southern arm of the pier was built in 1766 and extended in 1785, to add to the first pier of which was built prior to 1512.

During the English Civil War Penzance was sacked by the Parliamentarian forces of Sir Thomas Fairfax apparently for the kindness shown to Lord Goring and Lord Hopton's troops during the conflict.

Further civic improvements included the construction in 1759 of a reservoir which supplied water to public pumps in the streets. In 1768 a friendly society of Tradesmen was formed at Penzance with 101 members living within three miles of the town. The members met on the first Monday in each month at the King's Head, kept by Richard Runnals. The benefits of the Society were: a member being sick, lame or infirm would receive seven shillings a week. [gout and rupture were common, and excepted from payment unless 'needful'. Aged and infirm members were allowed 3/6p per week. Three pounds was given toward the funeral of a member and 10 pounds to the widow or children. All members were to attend the funeral or be fined a shilling. How long this association lasted is not known.

==== 1755 seiche ====
On 1 November 1755 the Lisbon earthquake caused seiching, a form of standing wave in an enclosed or partially enclosed body of water, along the Cornish coast, and particularly in Mount's Bay, which is prone to seiching. At around 2:00 pm, the sea rose eight feet (2.4 m) in Penzance, came in at great speed, and fell at the same rate. Little damage was recorded.

=== 19th century ===
==== 1801–1848 ====
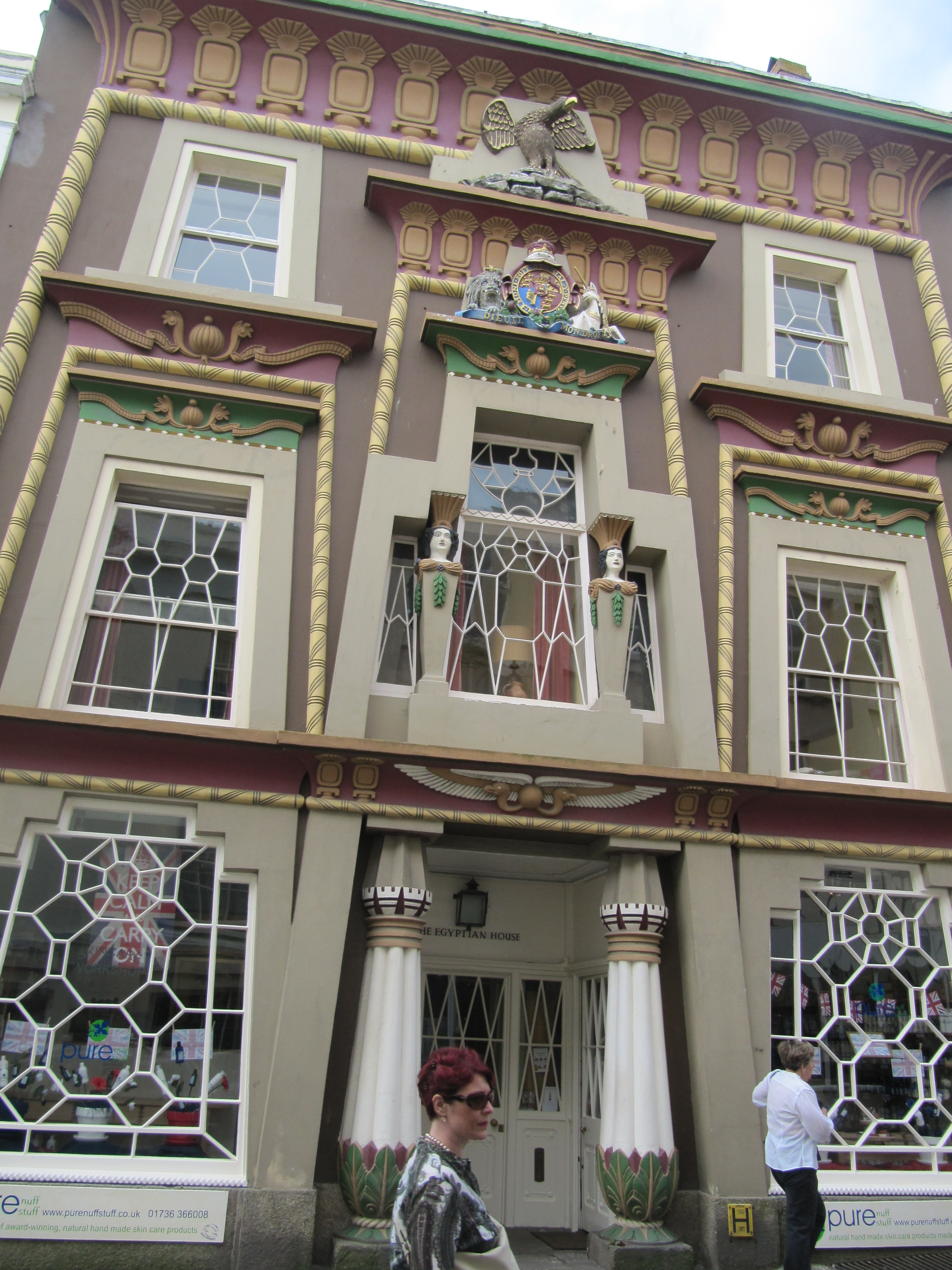
Egyptian House

At the start of the 19th century (1801), the town had a population of 2,248. The census, which is taken every ten years, recorded a peak population in 1861 of 3,843, but it then declined, as in most of Cornwall, through the remainder of the century, being just 3,088 in 1901.

By the time Queen Victoria came to the throne in 1837, Penzance had established itself as an important regional centre. The Royal Geological Society of Cornwall was founded in the town in 1814 and about 1817 was responsible for introducing a miner's safety tamping bar, which attracted the Prince Regent to become its patron.

The first lifeboat in Cornwall was bought by the people of Penzance in 1803 but it was sold in 1812 due to lack of funds to keep it in operation. The pier had been extended again in 1812 and John Matthews opened a small dry dock in 1814, the first in the South West. In 1840 Nicholas Holman of St Just opened a branch of his foundry business on the quayside. These facilities proved valuable in supporting the steamships that were soon calling at the harbour in increasing numbers.

Gas lighting was introduced in 1830 and the old Market House was demolished in 1836. Its replacement, designed by W. Harris of Bristol, was completed at the top of Market Jew Street in 1838. (The name Market Jew comes from the Cornish language Marghas Yow, meaning Thursday Market, the name of a nearby village now absorbed into Marazion, to which Market Jew Street leads.) St Mary's Church, another prominent feature of the Penzance skyline, was completed in 1836, while a Roman Catholic church was built in 1843. Another familiar building from this period is the eccentric Egyptian House in Chapel Street, built in 1830. The first part of the Promenade along the sea front dates from 1844.

==== 1849–1900 ====
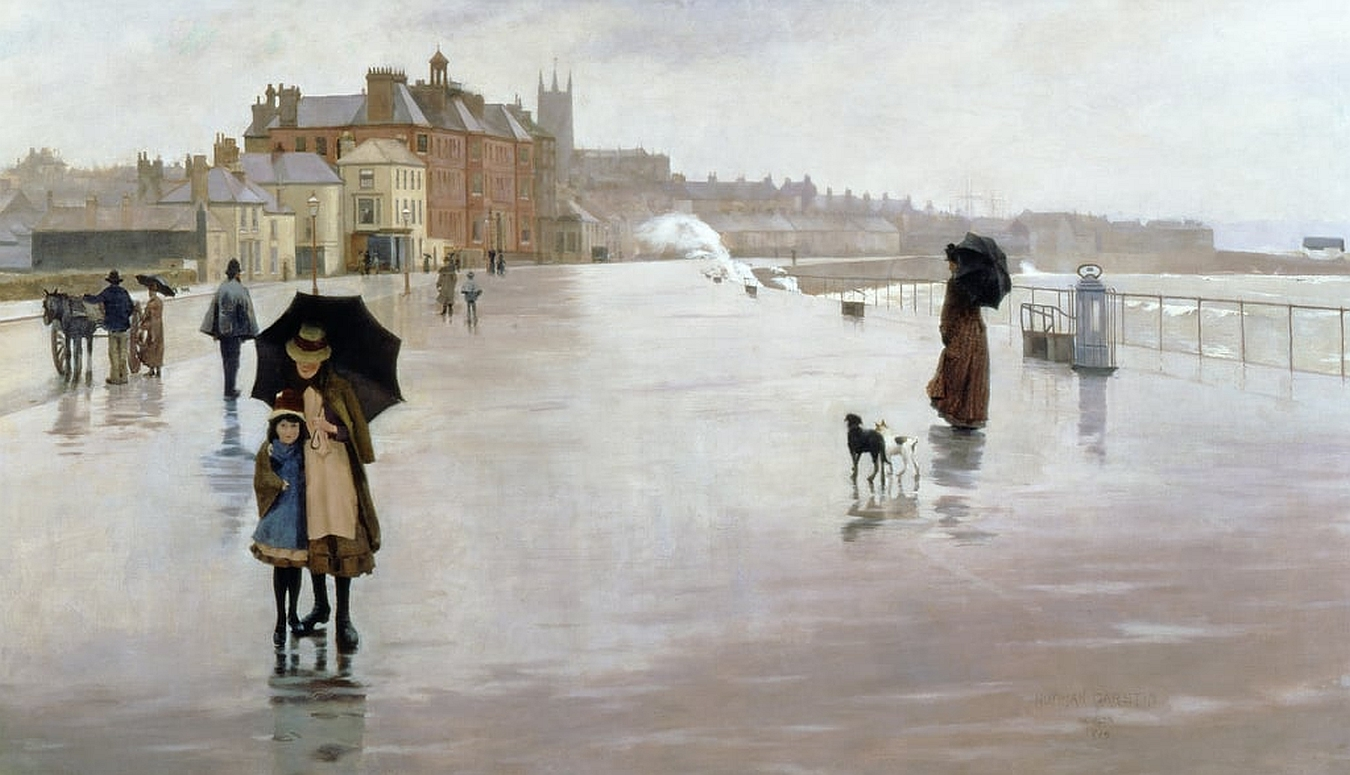
The Rain It Raineth Every Day, a painting of Penzance sea front by Norman Garstin, 1889

After the passing of the Public Health Act 1848, Penzance was one of the first towns to petition to take on the powers to improve public health allowed by the act, doing so in September that year. A report by a government inspector in February 1849 found that most streets were macadamised or sometimes paved, and the town was lit by 121 gas lamps from October to March each year, although they were not lit when there was a full moon. Water was supplied from 6 public pumps, and there were a further 53 private wells. There were no sewage pipes at the time, waste being collected from the main streets by a refuse cart. The borough council was therefore given powers to act as a local board of health under the terms of the act in September 1849, giving it powers to lay sewers, improve water supply and improve the paving and lighting of the streets.

Penzance was connected to the Electric Telegraph network in 1863 when the Electric and International Telegraph Company opened stations at Truro, Redruth, Penzance, Camborne, Liskard and St Austell.

Railway station

Penzance railway station, the terminus of the West Cornwall Railway, opened on 11 March 1852 on the eastern side of the harbour, although trains only ran to Redruth at first. From 25 August 1852 the line was extended to Truro, but the Cornwall Railway linking that place with Plymouth was not opened until 4 May 1859. Passengers and goods had to change trains at Truro as the West Cornwall had been built using the 4 ft 8 1/2 in (1,435 mm) standard gauge, but the Cornwall Railway was built to the 7 ft (2,134 mm) broad gauge. The West Cornwall Railway Act included a clause that it would be converted to broad gauge once it had been connected to another broad gauge line, but the company could not raise the funds to do so.

The line was sold to the Great Western Railway and its "Associated Companies" (the Bristol and Exeter Railway and South Devon Railway) on 1 January 1866. The new owners quickly converted the line to mixed gauge using three rails so that both broad and "narrow" trains could operate. Broad gauge goods trains started running in November that year, with through passenger trains running to London Paddington from 1 March 1867. The last broad gauge train arrived at 8.49pm on 20 May 1892, having left London Paddington at 10.15am that morning. The two locomotives, numbers 1256 and 3557, took the carriages away to Swindon Works at 9.57pm, and all trains since have been standard gauge.

The ability of the railway to carry fresh produce to distant markets such as Bristol, London and Manchester enabled local farmers and fishermen to sell more produce and at better prices. The special "perishable" train soon became a feature of the railway, these being fast extra goods trains carrying potatoes, broccoli or fish depending on the season. In August 1861, 1,787 tons of potatoes, 867 tons of broccoli, and 1,063 tons of fish were dispatched from the station. Fruit and flowers were also carried; the mild climate around Penzance and on the Scilly Isles meant that they were ready for market earlier and could command high prices.

The completion of the railway through Cornwall made it easier for tourists and invalids to enjoy the mild climate of Penzance. Bathing machines had been advertised for hire on the beach as early as 1823, and the town was already "noted for the pleasantness of its situation, the salubrity of its air, and the beauty of its natives". The town's first official guide book was published in 1860, and the Queen's Hotel opened on the seafront the following year. It was so successful that it was extended in 1871 and 1908.

Harbour

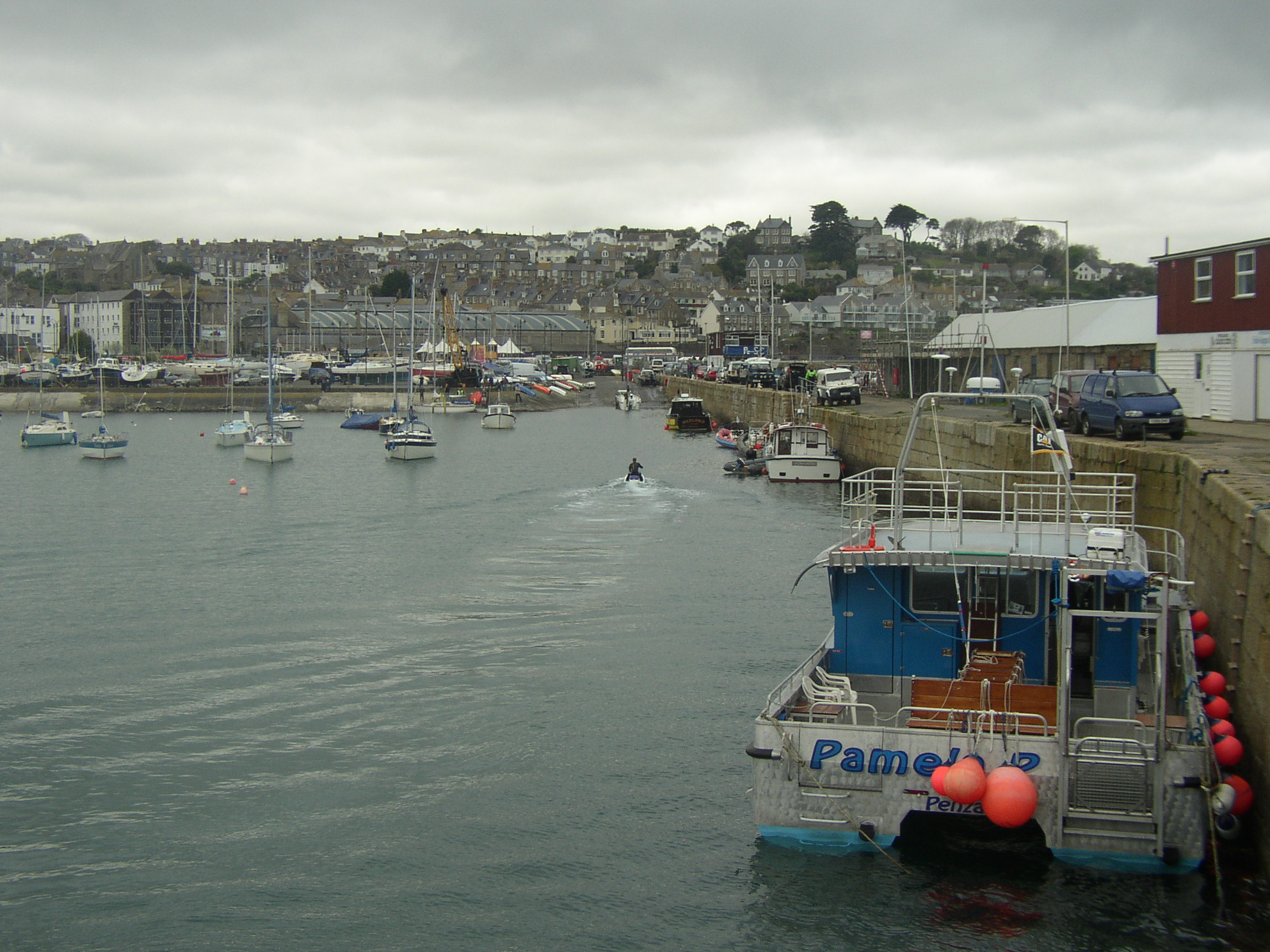
Penzance Harbour.

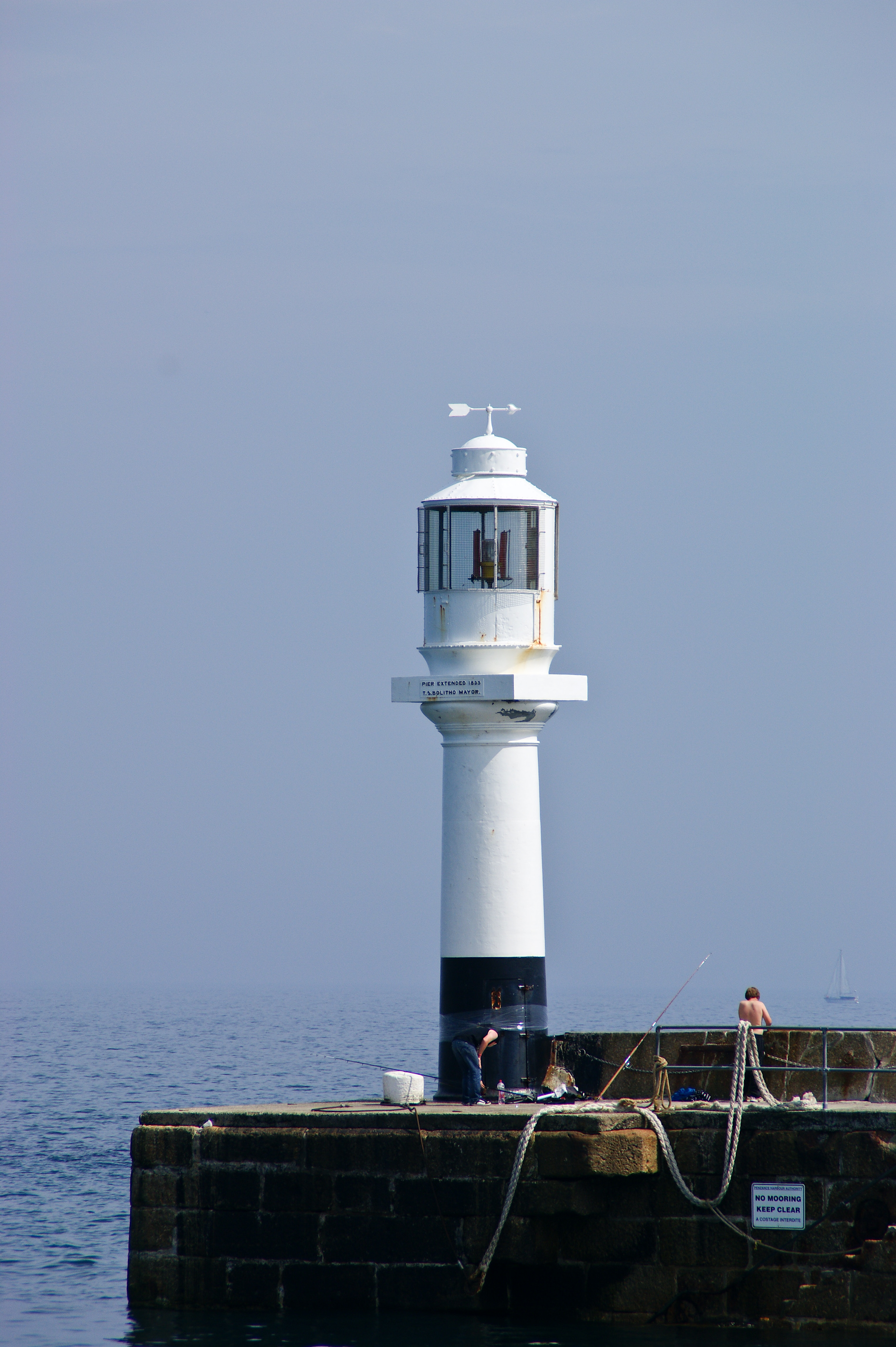
The pier head light, with a plaque marking the extension of the Old Pier in 1853.

At the same time as the railway was being built more improvements were being made to the harbour, with a second pier on the eastern side of the harbour, the Albert Pier, completed in 1853 to provide even better shelter for shipping. At the same time the Old Pier was also extended, and a lighthouse was built on it (replacing an earlier light), commissioned in 1855. The lighthouse (which was originally lit by an oil lamp within a fifth-order Fresnel lens) was built by Sandys & co. of Hayle and displayed a fixed red or green light, depending on the height of the tide. It remains operational, displaying a flashing sector light, which is visible up to 17 nmi (31 km; 20 mi) out to sea.

The Scilly Isles Steam Navigation Company was founded in 1858 and placed in service the first steam ship on the route, SS Little Western. In 1870 the new West Cornwall Steam Ship Company joined the route, taking over the Scilly Isles Company the following year.

In 1853 the Royal National Lifeboat Institution stationed one of their boats in the town, the first since 1812, and maintained a station here until 1908 when the Watson Class Elizabeth Blanche was transferred to Newlyn as the first step towards setting up Penlee Lifeboat Station. The RNLI still use a boat house built on Jennings Street near the Promenade in 1884 to promote their activities.

Penzance, with its dry dock and engineering facilities, was chosen as the western depot for Trinity House that serviced all the lighthouses and lightships from Start Point to Trevose Head. It was opened in October 1866 adjacent to the harbour and the Buoy Store became the Trinity House National Lighthouse Museum until 2005 when Trinity House closed the museum.

Improvements

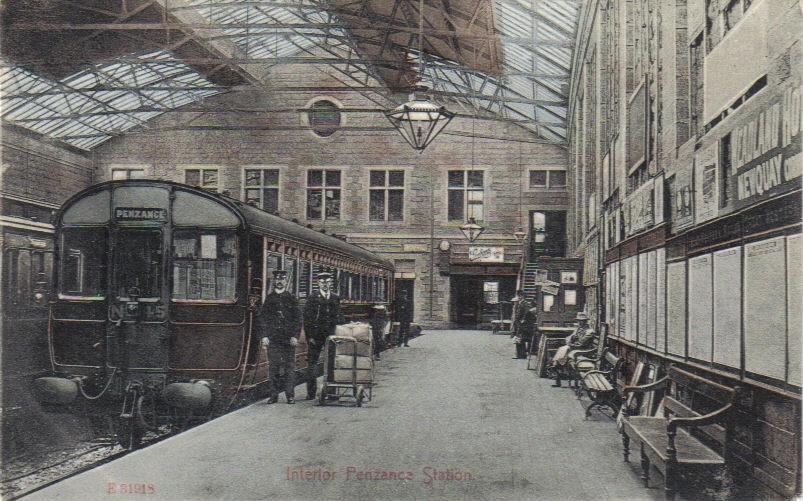
Inside the new railway station. taken circa 1915

In 1875 a local newspaper described the railway station as a large dog's house of the nastiest and draughtiest kind but a series of works improved this part of the town during the 1880s. The original railway station was rebuilt with the present buildings and train shed over the platforms (1880). The lower end of Market Jew Street was widened and a new road was built to link the station with the harbour over the Ross Swing Bridge (1881) (named after Charles Campbell Ross), allowing the construction of proper sewers beneath. A larger dry dock replaced Matthews' original facility (1880), and a floating harbour was made (1884) with lock gates to keep in the water at low tide.

Around the headland, public baths were opened on the Promenade in 1887 and the Morrab Gardens with its sub-tropical plants was opened two years later. A bandstand was added to the gardens in 1897.

=== 20th century ===
Market Jew Street, Penzance's main street

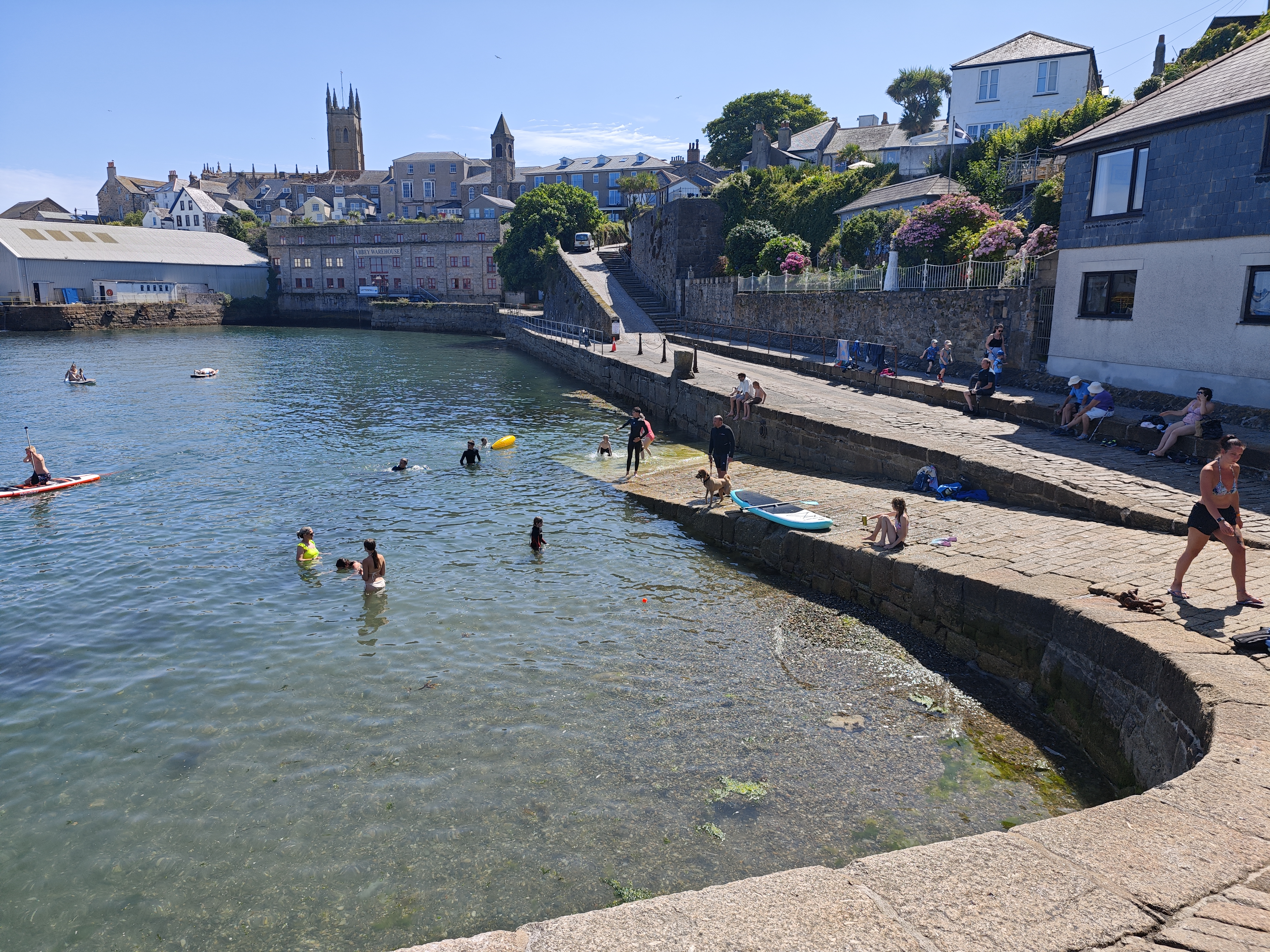
Sea swimming and paddleboarding is popular in Penzance. The abbey slip at high tide

In 1901 the town had a population of 3,088. The decennial census recorded a continuing decline in population until 1921, when just 2,616 people were recorded. The population then climbed to 4,888 (1931) then 5,545 (1951), with much of the increase between 1931 and 1951 being due to the borough's expansion in 1934 to take in Newlyn, Mousehole, Gulval and Heamoor. It was then larger than at any time in the past.

A proposed electric tramway along the Promenade to Newlyn, which would have continued as a light railway to St Just, failed to gain authorisation in 1898. Instead motor buses were put into service on 31 October 1903. These linked Penzance with Marazion and were operated by the Great Western Railway, being introduced only 11 weeks after the railway's pioneering service between Helston and the Lizard. They were considered a success, carrying 16,091 passengers by the end of the year, so were followed the next spring by further routes to Land's End and St Just. These services developed into the First Kernow bus network that currently serves the area and is still centred on a terminus alongside Penzance railway station.

In 1912, Penzance erected its first electric street lamps and the town's first cinema opened.

The dry dock was sold on 25 August 1904 to N. Holman and Sons Limited, the engineering business that had been trading in Penzance since 1840. New workshops would be built during the 1930s, and the facility continued to be used by the Scilly ferries and other merchant ships, as well as Trinity House, the Royal Navy and Royal Maritime Auxiliary Service. In 1951 a new vessel for the King Harry Ferry on the River Fal was launched, built on the keel of an old landing craft. A steam tug, the Primrose, was built in 1963.

Land was reclaimed beside the Albert Pier in the 1930s to allow the railway station to be enlarged at a cost of £134,000. The 1880 building was retained, but extra platforms and sidings were provided to handle more perishable goods, as well as the increasing numbers of tourists.

In 1905 a new bandstand was built on the Promenade opposite the Queen's Hotel, and the Pavilion Theatre opened nearby in 1911, complete with a roof garden and café. Travel to Penzance was easier than ever, with the Great Western Railway introducing the Cornish Riviera Express on 1 July 1904, which left London Paddington at 10:10 am and arrived in Penzance just 7 hours later, two hours faster than the previous quickest service. (In 2018 it left Paddington at 10:03 am and took 5 hours and 8 minutes.) The railway promoted local tourism with postcards that were sold at its railway stations, and an annual guide book, The Cornish Riviera, in which SPB Mais described the town as "a suburb of Covent Garden, and a great fishing centre ... there is always something going on in its harbour".

1923 saw a new road link the harbour area and the Promenade, and in 1933 the St. Anthony Gardens were built, followed two years later by the Jubilee Pool opposite. Tourists could now make full use of the whole seafront between Penzance and Newlyn harbours.

In the early 1990s, a bypass was built around the town.

== Transport ==
=== Railway ===
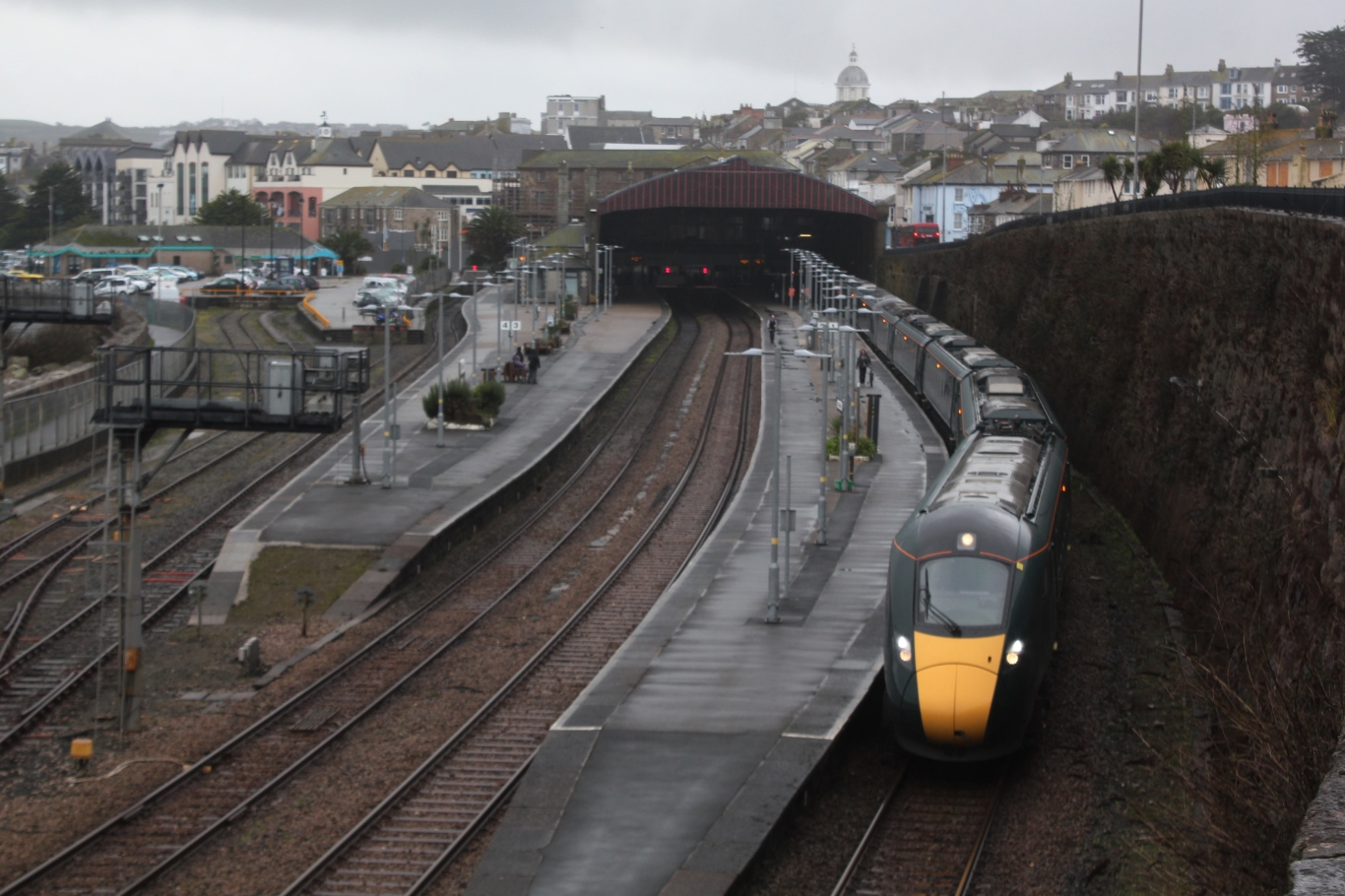
Penzance station

Penzance railway station is sited at the eastern end of Market Jew Street and close to the harbour; it is the southernmost station on the UK mainland rail network. The station is the western terminus of the Cornish Main Line, which runs above the beach to Marazion; this affords passengers good views of St. Michael's Mount and Mount's Bay.

Services are operated by two train operating companies:

- Great Western Railway operates local services to St Erth, St Ives, Hayle, Camborne, Redruth and Truro. It provides inter-city trains to Plymouth, Exeter St Davids, Bristol Temple Meads, Reading and London Paddington. The Night Riviera train offers an overnight sleeping car service to and from Reading and London. Journey time to Plymouth is typically under 2 hours, to Bristol around 4 hours and London around 5 1/2 hours.
- CrossCountry runs a small number of services (departing in the morning, arriving in the evening) providing a service to destinations such as Birmingham New Street, Derby, Sheffield, Leeds, York, Newcastle and Edinburgh. The company previously operated a train from Aberdeen, with a journey time of over 13 hours. It was the longest direct rail service in the United Kingdom. However, this route was shortened to Plymouth as of 16 May 2025.

=== Buses ===
The bus and coach station is next to the railway station from where National Express operates coach services to London Victoria Coach Station (taking around 9 hours) via Heathrow Airport. Local bus services run by Go Cornwall Bus connect Penzance with most major settlements in Cornwall, including Truro, St Ives, St Just, St Buryan, Land's End and also Plymouth in Devon.

=== Roads ===
The A30 from London to Land's End is a trunk road as far as the Chy-an-Mor roundabout, a mile (1.6 km) to the east of Penzance. After bypassing Penzance to the north the road continues to Land's End mainly as a rural A route. The A30 provides a fast connection to the M5 motorway at Exeter 111 miles (179 km) to the north-east. The distance from Penzance to London is 275 miles (443 km), with a 5 hour journey time.

=== Water ===
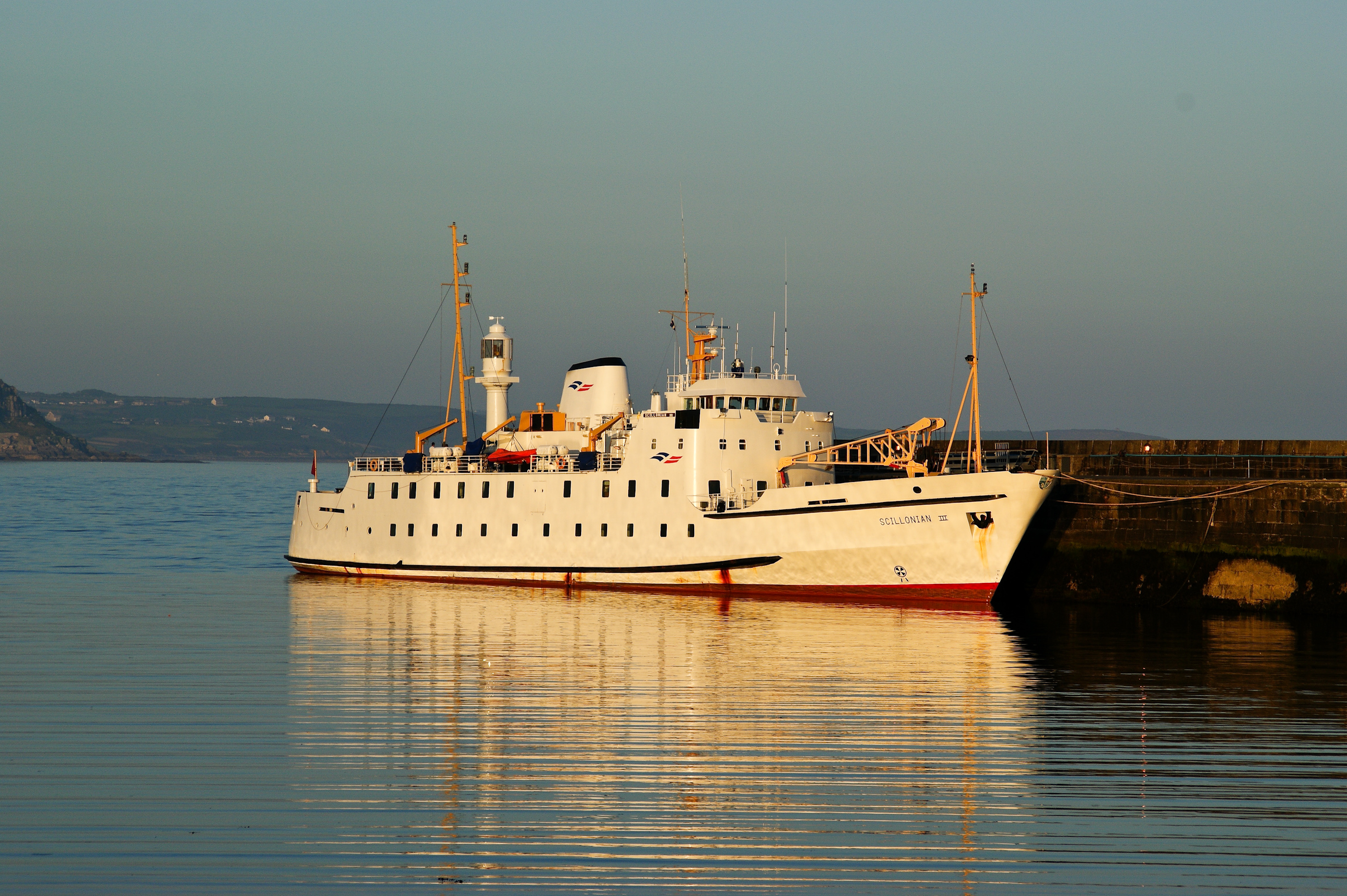
Scillonian III docked in Penzance Harbour

A ferry service operates between Penzance Harbour and the Isles of Scilly. The Scillonian III, carries both foot-passengers and cargo; sailing time is about 2 hours and 40 minutes.

=== Air ===
From 1964 to 2012, and again since 2020, Penzance Heliport offers a helicopter route to the Isles of Scilly. Until 2012, the service was run by British International, but this ended on 1 November 2012 due to rising costs and falling passenger numbers. The heliport was subsequently demolished and replaced by a supermarket. In 2020, a new heliport opened not far from the location of the previous one and offers again services to the islands of Tresco and St Mary's (operated by Penzance Helicopters in conjunction with Sloane Helicopters). A bus service run by the Skybus Airline Service connects with Land's End Airport for fixed wing flights (15 minutes) to the Isles of Scilly. The buses leave from the railway station, near the taxi rank.

Newquay Airport is 41 miles (66 km) away and offers flights to Gatwick, Heathrow, Dublin, Cork and many other places, including an increasing number of European destinations.

== Governance ==
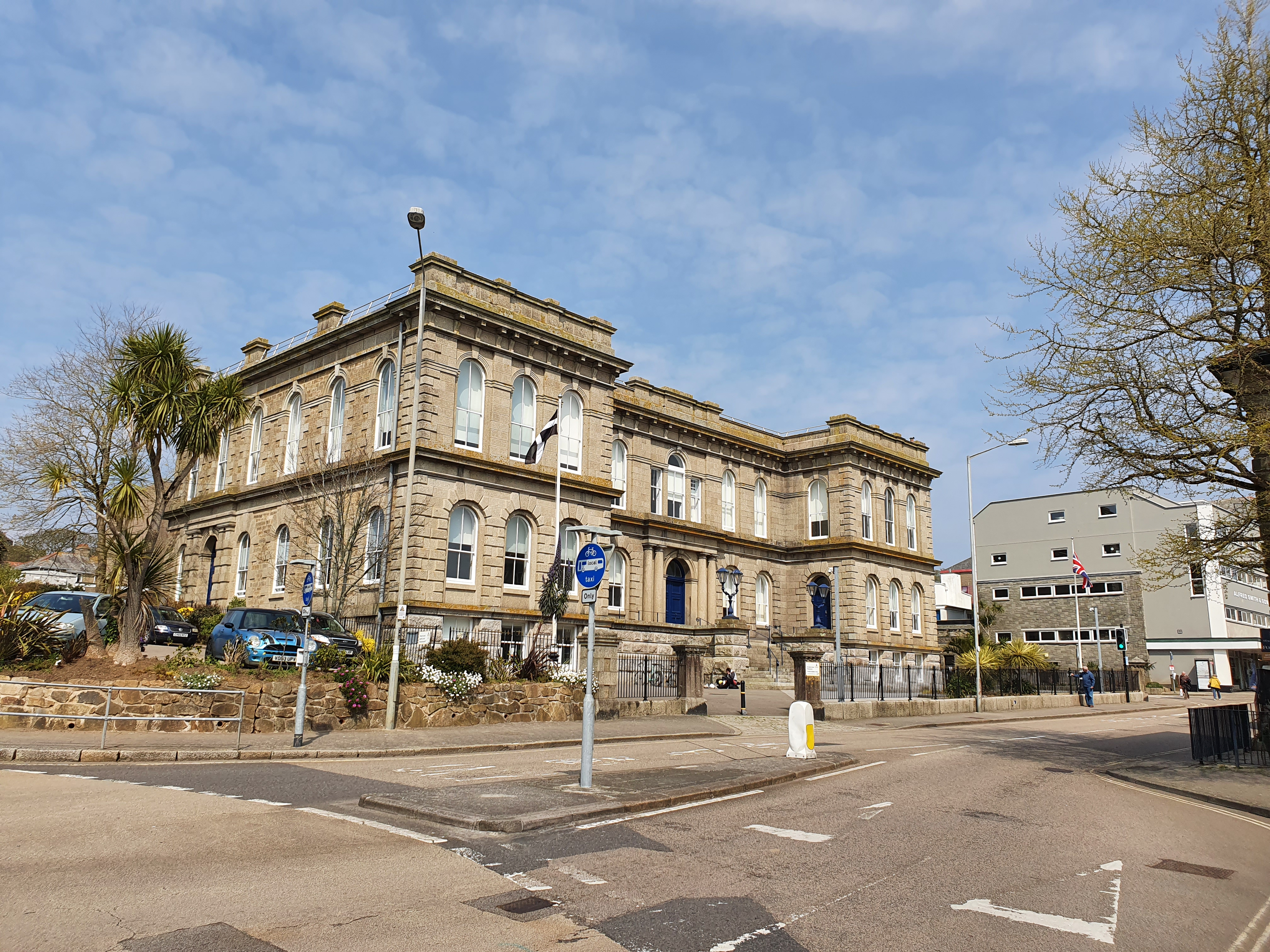
St John's Hall

There are two tiers of local government covering Penzance, at parish (town) and unitary authority level: Penzance Town Council (which generally styles itself "Penzance Council") and Cornwall Council. The town council has its offices at the Penlee Centre, in the outbuildings of Penlee House, and usually meets at St John's Hall.

=== Administrative history ===
Penzance historically formed part of the ancient parish of Madron in the Penwith Hundred of Cornwall. The town was incorporated as a borough in 1614. The borough was reformed to become a municipal borough in 1836 under the Municipal Corporations Act 1835, which standardised how most boroughs operated across the country.

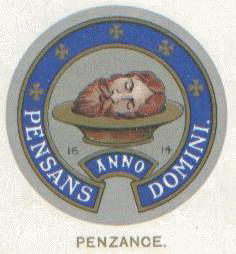
Common seal of the Borough of Penzance, used in lieu of a coat of arms 1614–1934 (now the Mayoral Seal)

The borough remained part of the parish of Madron into the 19th century. From the 17th century onwards, parishes were gradually given various civil functions under the poor laws, in addition to their original ecclesiastical functions. In some cases, including Madron, the civil functions were exercised by subdivisions of the parish rather than the parish as a whole. Poor law functions were administered separately for Penzance and the rest of Madron parish. In 1866, the legal definition of 'parish' was changed to be the areas used for administering the poor laws, and so Penzance became a separate civil parish from Madron. (Note: The boundary between Penzance and Madron adopted for poor law purposes, which therefore became the civil parish boundary in 1866, differed slightly from the borough boundary. Whereas the borough boundary was defined mathematically as a half mile radius from the market cross in the Greenmarket, the civil parish boundary followed identifiable features on the ground. When the Local Government Act 1894 split parishes which straddled borough boundaries, this led to the creation of two new civil parishes called "Madron in Penzance" covering the bits of the old Madron civil parish inside the circle of the borough of Penzance, and "Penzance in Madron" covering the bits of the old Penzance civil parish outside the circle of the borough boundary. Both these parishes comprised multiple thin slithers of land around the edge of the borough. These two unusual parishes endured until they were abolished as part of a wider review of parish and borough boundaries in 1934. As urban parishes, neither had parish councils.) In ecclesiastical terms, Penzance had been a chapelry to Madron, but had its own clergy from 1741. Penzance eventually also became a separate ecclesiastical parish from Madron in 1871.

In 1934 the borough absorbed the nearby settlements of Newlyn, Paul and Mousehole (from Paul Urban District), Gulval (from West Penwith Rural District) and Heamoor (from Madron Urban District).

The borough of Penzance was abolished in 1974 under the Local Government Act 1972, when the area became part of the Penwith district. The area of the former borough became unparished under the 1974 reforms, and the Penwith district councillors representing the area acted as charter trustees for the town. In 1980 a new civil parish of Penzance was created, covering the area of the pre-1974 borough. The new parish council declared the parish to be a town, allowing it to take the name Penzance Town Council and allowing the chair of the council to take the title of mayor. The Mayor of Penzance is appointed every year in May. Though much of their time is taken up with ceremonial duties, they work closely with the town clerk and Cornwall Council to deliver a wide range of services and amenities for the town.

The civil parish of Penzance was extended in 2004 to include Eastern Green, formerly part of the civil parish of Ludgvan.

Penwith district was abolished in 2009. Cornwall County Council then took on district-level functions, making it a unitary authority, and was renamed Cornwall Council.

== Economy ==
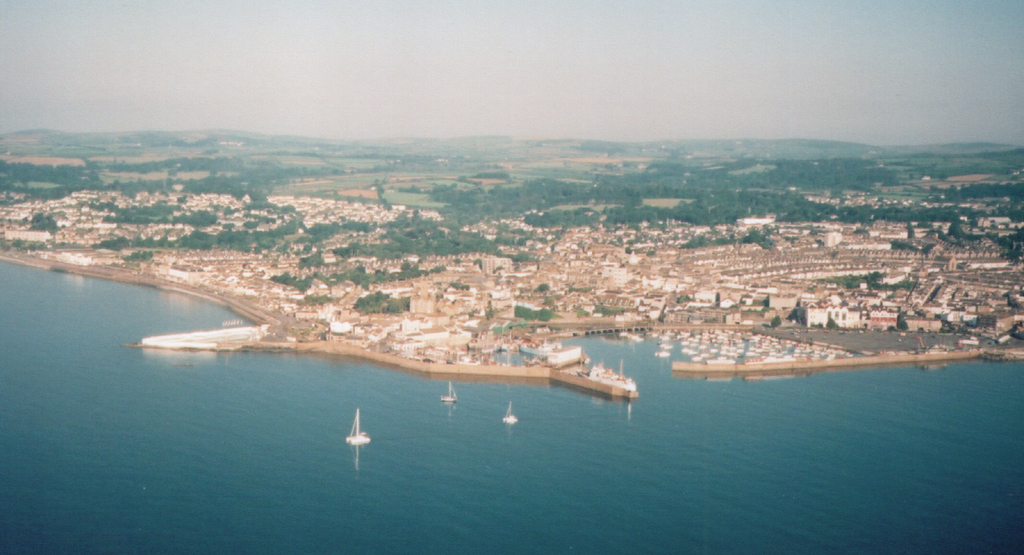
Penzance Harbour and surrounding area as seen from the air

The economy of Penzance has, like those of many Cornish communities, suffered from the decline of the traditional industries of fishing, mining and agriculture. Penzance now has a mixed economy consisting of light industrial, tourism and retail businesses. However, like the rest of Cornwall, housing remains comparatively expensive, wages low and unemployment high. In 2007, house prices rose 274% from 10 years prior, the fastest rise in the UK. The fishing port of Newlyn, which falls within the parish boundaries, provides some employment in the area, but has also been greatly affected by the decline in the fishing industry over the last 30 years. In the 2004 index of deprivation Penzance is listed as having 3 wards within the top 10% for employment deprivation, Penzance East (125th most deprived in England) Penzance West (200th most deprived in England), and Penzance Central (712th most deprived in England). 18–31% of households in the parish are described as "poor households". Penzance East also has one of the highest unemployment rates in Cornwall, stated as 15.4%.

=== Mining ===
Following Sir Humphry Davy's contribution to the mining industry, the Miners' Association began mining classes in Penzance. As mining in the area became more complex, the Penzance Mining and Science School was founded in 1890. The school continued to teach mining until 1910, when it was amalgamated with Camborne and Redruth Mining School forming the School of Metalliferous Mining in Camborne, which is now known as the Camborne School of Mines. This institution has now moved to the Combined Universities in Cornwall campus at Tremough, Falmouth. From 1663, Penzance was a coinage town, responsible for the collection of tin taxation on behalf of the Duchy of Cornwall; it held this status for 176 years. According to William Pryce in his 1778 book Mineralogia Cornubiensis, Penzance coined more tin than the towns of Liskeard, Lostwithiel and Helston put together.

Penzance also had its own submarine mine situated off the coast of the town next to the area known as Wherrytown. The mine, known as Wheal Wherry Mine, was worked from 1778 to 1798 and again from 1836 to 1840. Founded by "a poor 57 year old miner" named Thomas Curtis, the mine was said to be "very rich at depth" and was connected to the shore by a wooden bridge; the ore was transported by wherry boat. The mine suffered considerable damage in 1798 when an American ship broke anchor off nearby Newlyn and smashed into the bridge and head gear. Later attempts at mining were not as profitable.

During the 19th century and until 1912, Penzance had the largest tin smelting house in Cornwall, operated by the Bolitho family. The smelting works were situated at Chyandour. As a consequence of this concentration of mining wealth, Penzance became a centre for commercial banking. The Bolitho Bank (now part of Barclays Bank) and the Penzance Bank were two of the largest, although the latter collapsed in 1896.

== Main sights ==
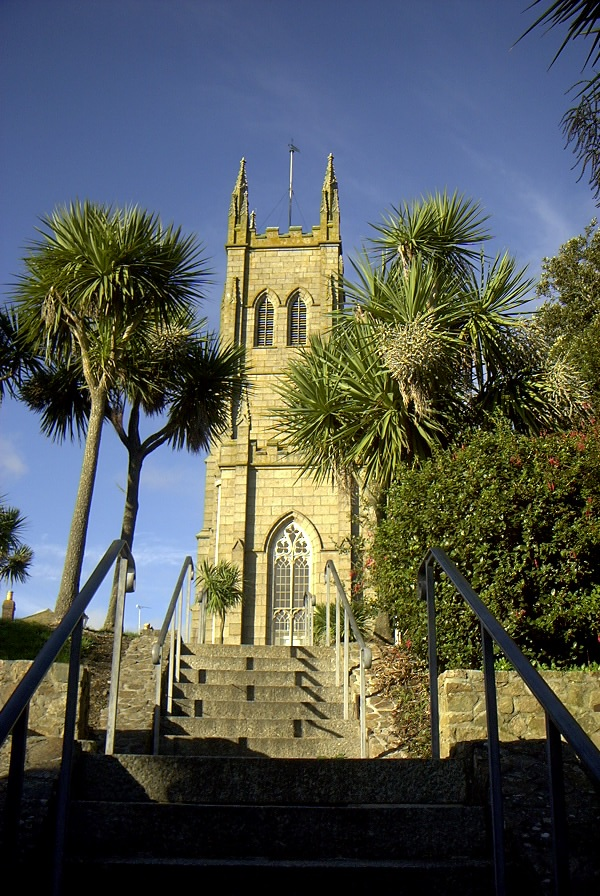
St Mary's Church, Chapel Street

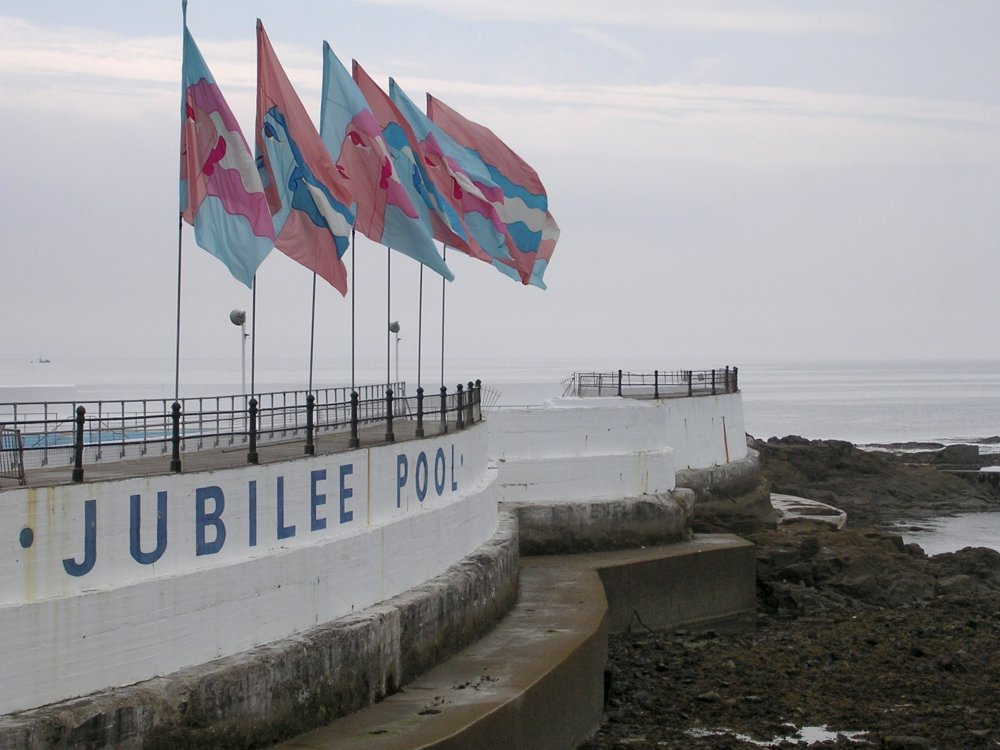
Jubilee Pool, Penzance

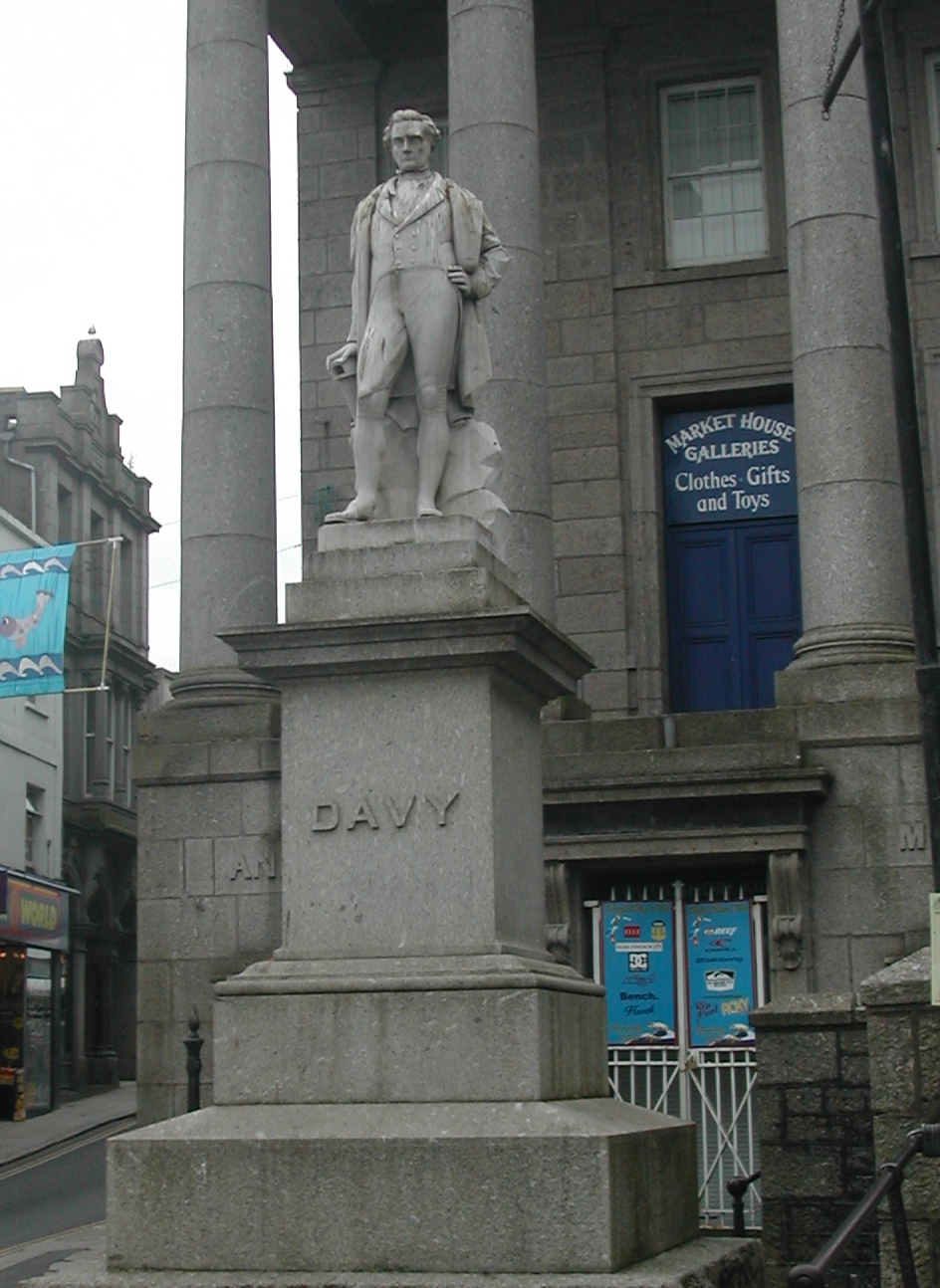
Humphry Davy Statue and Penzance Market House

Large sections of Penzance are classified as ″conservation areas″ under the Penwith local plan and are subject to special planning laws. The current conservation area forms most of the core of the town of Penzance and the historic harbour areas of Newlyn and Mousehole. A number of Georgian and Regency buildings are present in the town. However, the majority of developments in the town centre itself are of mixed date, including several 20th-century buildings – one of which, the former Pearl Assurance building (now the Tremenheere Wetherspoon's pub), was subject to comment by Sir John Betjeman who wrote, in 1963:

"Penzance has done much to destroy its attractive character. The older houses in the narrow centre round the market hall have been pulled down and third-rate commercial 'contemporary', of which the Pearl Assurance building is a nasty example, are turning it into Slough".

The Market Building (1836–38) in Market Jew Street was designed by William Harris, District Surveyor for Bristol, in the Greek Revival style. It has a grand Ionic portico and is surmounted by a dome. Alterations for Lloyds Bank were carried out in 1922–25.

Penzance's former main street Chapel Street has a number of interesting features, including the Egyptian House, the Union Hotel (including a Georgian theatre which is no longer in use) and Branwell House, where the mother and aunt of the famous Brontë sisters once lived. The Georgian theatre was built in c. 1787, closed in 1831, and is said to be where the first public announcement of Nelson's victory at Trafalgar took place. Regency, and Georgian terraces and houses (such as Regents Square and Clarence Street) are common in some parts of the town. The nearby sub-tropical Morrab Gardens, has a large collection of tender trees and shrubs, many of which cannot be grown outdoors anywhere else in the UK. Also of interest is the seafront with its promenade and the open-air seawater Jubilee Pool (one of the oldest surviving Art Deco swimming baths in the country), built during Penzance's heyday as a fashionable seaside resort. The pool was designed by Captain F. Latham, the Penzance Borough Engineer, and opened in 1935, the year of King George V's Silver Jubilee. The grade II listed pool is triangular with graceful curves and is considered the best surviving example of its type, with the exception of the Saltdean Lido in Brighton. In early 2018, work began to add a geothermal section to the pool, becoming the first of its kind in the United Kingdom to use this type of technology when it eventually opens.

Penzance promenade has been destroyed in parts several times by storms. The most recent example was on 7 March 1962, when large parts of the western end of the promenade, the nearby Bedford Bolitho Gardens (now a play park) and the village of Wherrytown suffered severe damage. On the outskirts of town is Trereife House, a grade II listed Queen Anne style, manor house which now offers accommodation and hosts events.

== Geography ==
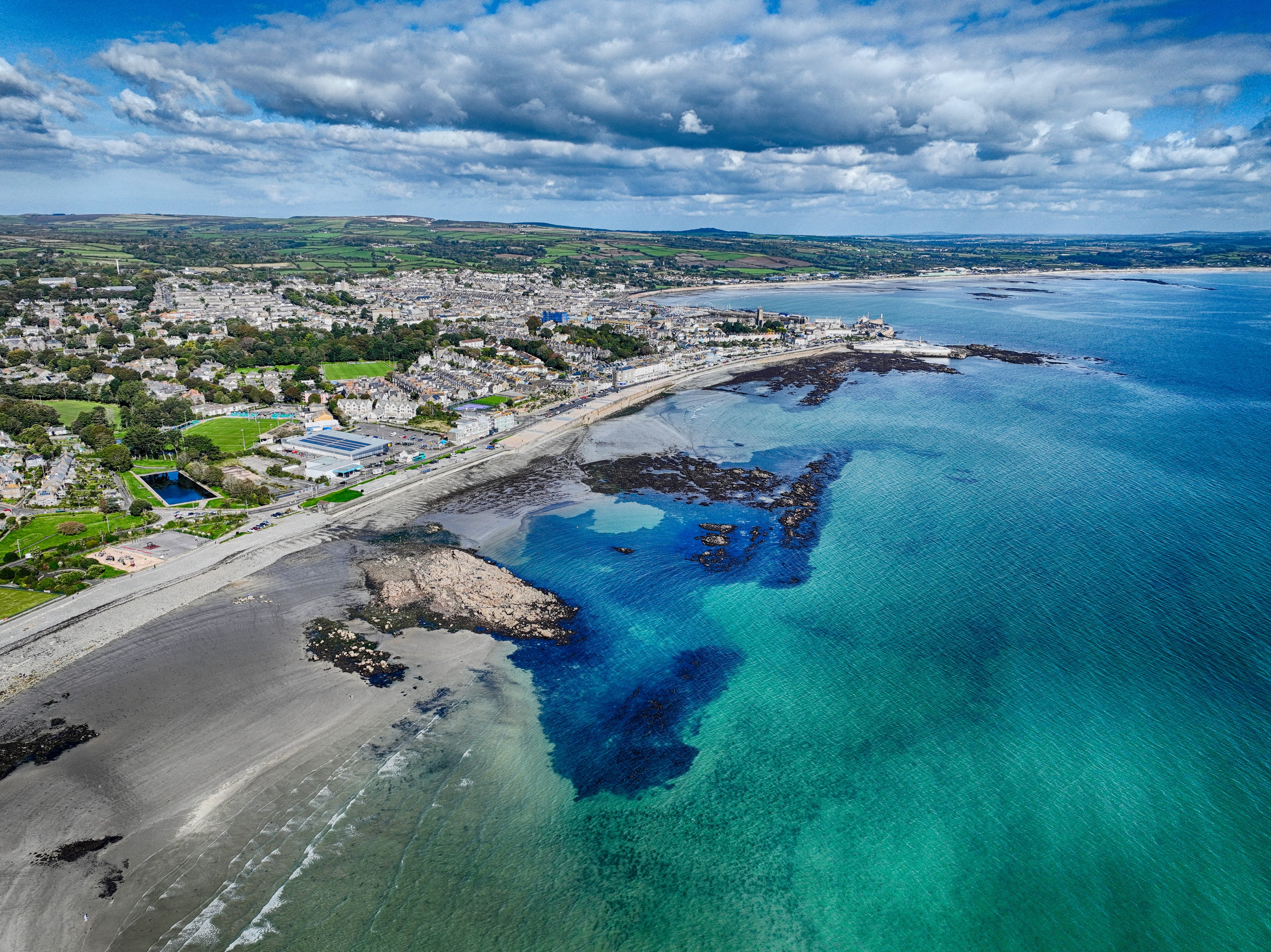
Aerial view of Wherry Town and Penzance, Cornwall, England.

Penlee Quarry which is within the boundaries of the Penzance parish is a geological SSSI.

== Climate ==
Penzance has an oceanic climate (Cfb) according to Köppen and a humid subtropical climate (Cf) according to Trewartha.

Climate data for Penzance, Penlee Gardens
Month	Jan	Feb	Mar	Apr	May	Jun	Jul	Aug	Sep	Oct	Nov	Dec	Year
Record high °C (°F)	15.0 (59.0)	15.6 (60.1)	18.3 (64.9)	22.2 (72.0)	26.1 (79.0)	29.9 (85.8)	28.9 (84.0)	29.4 (84.9)	26.1 (79.0)	23.5 (74.3)	17.2 (63.0)	15.5 (59.9)	29.9 (85.8)
Mean daily maximum °C (°F)	9.6 (49.3)	9.6 (49.3)	10.9 (51.6)	12.5 (54.5)	15.3 (59.5)	17.8 (64.0)	19.9 (67.8)	20.1 (68.2)	18.1 (64.6)	15.1 (59.2)	12.2 (54.0)	10.7 (51.3)	14.3 (57.8)
Mean daily minimum °C (°F)	4.4 (39.9)	4.5 (40.1)	5.3 (41.5)	6.0 (42.8)	8.5 (47.3)	10.8 (51.4)	13.0 (55.4)	13.1 (55.6)	11.4 (52.5)	9.5 (49.1)	7.0 (44.6)	5.8 (42.4)	8.3 (46.9)
Record low °C (°F)	−9.9 (14.2)	−6.7 (19.9)	−6.7 (19.9)	−2.5 (27.5)	−0.2 (31.6)	2.8 (37.0)	5.6 (42.1)	5.6 (42.1)	3.9 (39.0)	−1.1 (30.0)	−3.3 (26.1)	−4.4 (24.1)	−9.9 (14.2)
Average precipitation mm (inches)	124.3 (4.89)	95.2 (3.75)	87.7 (3.45)	65.4 (2.57)	62.8 (2.47)	57.8 (2.28)	63.4 (2.50)	78.1 (3.07)	83.2 (3.28)	111.9 (4.41)	125.3 (4.93)	138.5 (5.45)	1,093.6 (43.05)
Mean monthly sunshine hours	59.2	79.9	132.3	190.0	222.0	220.1	211.4	206.3	163.2	117.1	75.7	54.5	1,731.7
Source 1: Starlings Roost Weather (temperatures 1971-2000, precipitation and sunshine 1912-2003)
Source 2: Starlings Roost Weather (extremes 1912-2003)

== Education ==
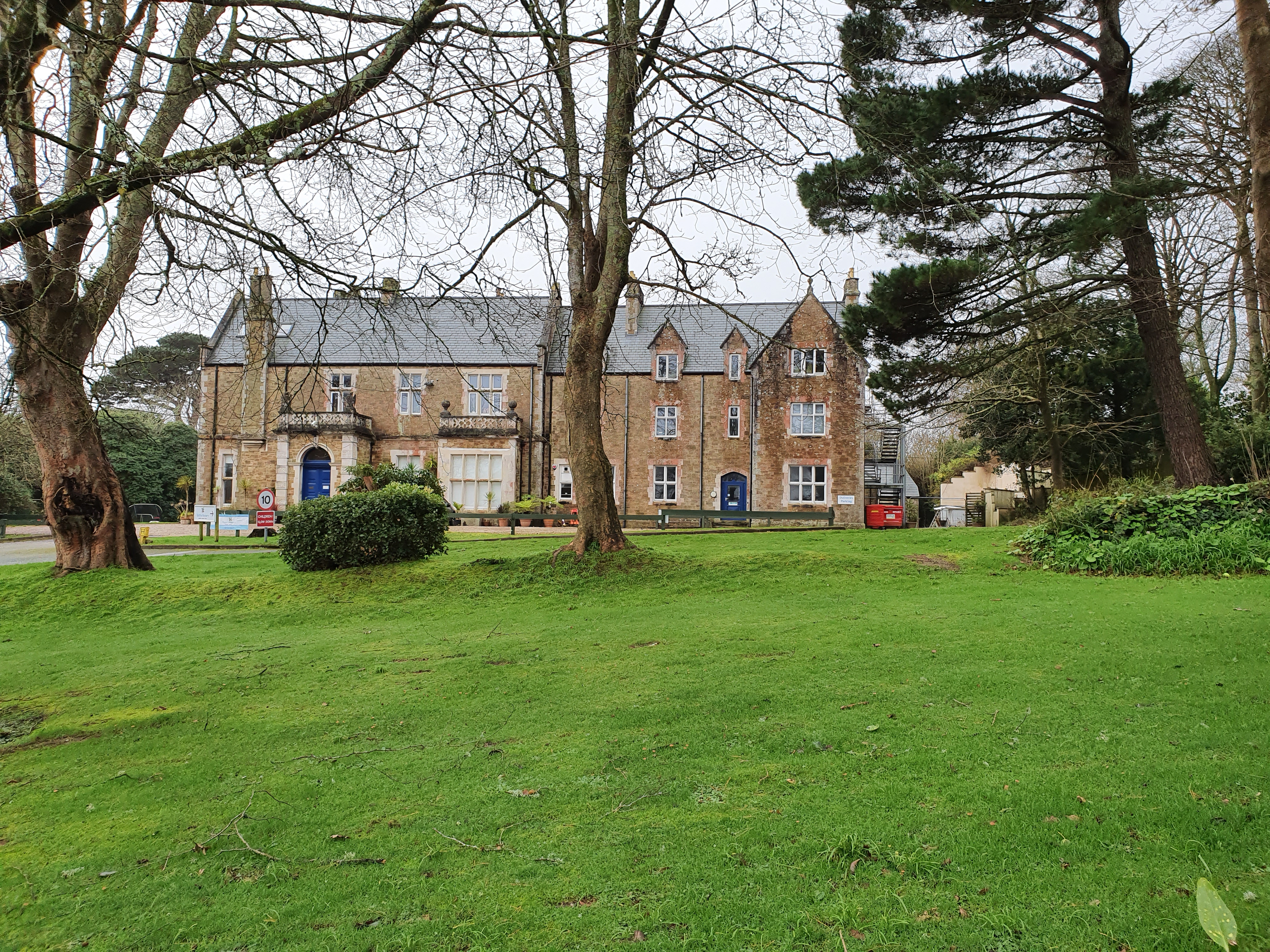
Polwithen House (former Bolitho School)

Penzance has two comprehensive schools, Mounts Bay Academy and Humphry Davy School. Post 16 education is catered for by Penwith College, founded in 1981 from the sixth form departments of the former Penzance Girls' Grammar School and the Humphry Davy Grammar School. In the Penzance parish there are 8 primary schools, including the newly created Pensans Primary School which was formed in 2006 from the former Penzance Junior School and the Lescudjack Infants School. There is also a special educational needs school within the parish boundary named Nancealverne.

Various other schools have existed in past times, including St Erbyn's School, West Cornwall School for Girls and Bolitho School at Polwithen House. The Polwithen site was originally home to Penzance Church of England Girls' High School and later the School of St Clare (a Woodard school) whose pupils included author Rosamund Pilcher and Ethiopian Princess Aida Desta. Bolitho School closed in 2017 because too few pupils were available. The building is now being developed as a care home, named the Frances Bolitho Care Home.

== Culture ==
=== Festivals ===
Every June since 1991 the Golowan Festival (which includes Mazey Day) has been held in the town. The name comes from the Cornish gool (meaning feast) and Jowan (a Cornish name equivalent to the English John) - loosely translating to 'Feast of St John' and marking the midsummer-eve as the vigil of John the Baptist.

Before the 1930s Penzance was the scene of large May Day celebrations, which saw local children making and using tin 'May horns' and 'May whistles'; a small revival of these traditions took place on 4 May 2008. The feast day of Corpus Christi was also celebrated in Penzance. The Corpus Christi fair has been a long-standing event in the town, and is currently undergoing attempts to revive it in a more traditional format.

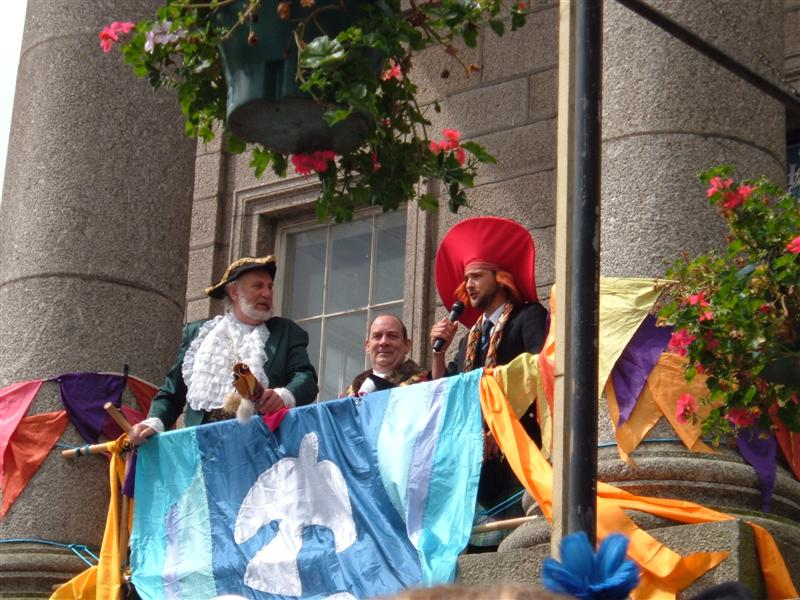
Mayor and Mock Mayor speeches at the Golowan Festival 2005.

The summer solstice was, in 1882, described as a very old custom and celebrated with all the rude revelry of heathendom. Bonfires were lit in the town centre and lines of tar barrels were swung along the streets by males and females. It was also accompanied by dancing of the roughest kind, uncouth dress and semi-disguise, sky and hand rockets, and all sorts of fireworks.

Around Penzance the period of Petertide has long been celebrated by Midsummer bonfires and sometimes the burning of effigies of unpopular residents.

Allantide, a Cornish version of Halloween, was also a popular activity in the town. Many of these customs were recorded by local antiquarian M. A. Courtney and have influenced historical views of traditional Cornish cultural activities.

In October 2010 the first full festival of music and the arts – the Penzance Proms – was held (23–31 October).

Every December Penzance holds the Montol Festival a community arts event reviving many of the Cornish customs of Christmas, including traditional costumes, masks and guise dancing.

=== Music and theatre ===
Penzance is the home of the pirates in Gilbert and Sullivan's comic opera The Pirates of Penzance. At the time the libretto was written, 1879, Penzance had become popular as a peaceful resort town, so the idea of it being overrun by pirates was amusing to contemporaries.

The Acorn Arts Centre, sited within a former Methodist chapel in Parade Street, provides a mixture of theatre, film, dance music and cabaret and is partially public funded. The Savoy is an independent cinema in Causewayhead which opened in 1912 and was originally named the Victoria Hall Music Hall. The Savoy is one of the locations of performances sponsored by the Penwith Film Society (an arts cinema society based in the Penwith area), it is reputedly the oldest continuously used cinema in Britain. Prior to the Second World War, Penzance was also home to a further three cinemas and at least two theatres, one of which, the Pavilion Theatre, is now home to an amusement arcade.

The 2016 pop single by indie group The Hit Parade "From Paddington to Penzance", takes as its subject a relationship that was formed on the railway line from London to Cornwall that terminates in Penzance.

=== Art galleries ===
Penzance is home to the new Newlyn Art Gallery establishment "The Exchange" which opened in 2007. Penlee House, an art gallery and museum notable for its collection of paintings by members of the Newlyn School. It was one of the former homes of the Branwell family. Within Penzance town centre there are a growing number of commercial art galleries.

=== Religion ===
As in other Cornish towns and villages Methodism was historically the predominant Christian denomination. Prior to the 1980s Penzance had six Methodist churches, but this number has now been reduced to two, Chapel Street and High Street. There are Methodist churches in most of the surrounding villages including Newlyn's Trinity Methodist which operates The Centre, a busy multi-use church and community facility. Penzance is also home to a citadel of the Salvation Army , a Roman Catholic church, two Church of England parish churches (formerly three), a Christadelphian meeting hall, two Evangelical independent churches, the Penwith pagan moot, an independent Baptist church and a Buddhist meditation group.

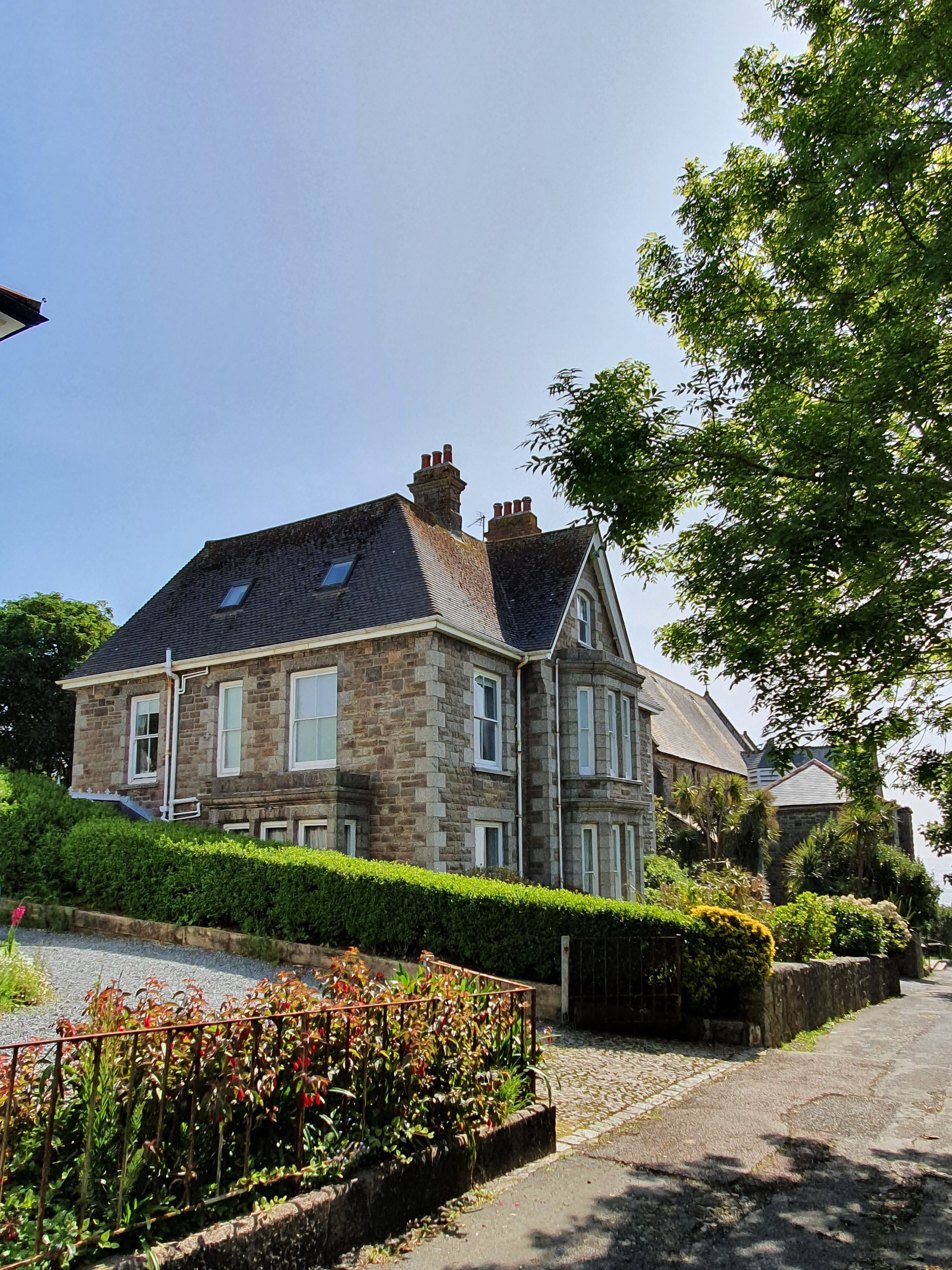
St John's Vicarage

St Mary's Church was built in 1832–35, St Paul's (now closed) in 1843 and St John's in 1881. Penzance was formerly in the parish of Madron but St Mary's parish was established in 1871 and St Paul's in 1869. Two medieval chapels (see above, History) are known to have existed before the Reformation. St Mary's chapel was consecrated in 1680 but was in existence three hundred years earlier and the licensing of it in 1379 is recorded. The chaplain's stipend was £4 p.a. from the manor of Alverton. In 1549 its endowments were seized by the Crown though the burgesses made representations that they should not be. Thomas Lamplugh Bishop of Exeter by much cajolery induced the mayor and burgesses to consent to consecration of the chapel in 1680. The curate then had a stipend of £5 p.a.

Arthur Langdon (1896) described a Cornish cross in front of the Market House. This cross stood in the Green Market until 1829 when it was removed to a house in North Street (Causewayhead) close to its original position. About 1868 it was moved again to the western end of the Market House. It is ornamented on the front and the sides. On the back there is said to be an inscription: PCMBUNT/QUICUMQ/VENIENT//COP/PIO/UM//O/+/X (described in 1850). It is now at Penlee House.

=== Sport ===
Penzance is the home of Cornwall's most successful rugby teams, the Cornish Pirates (Penzance & Newlyn RFC). The Championship side moved to Truro in 2005 and was renamed the Cornish Pirates in a bid to improve attendances and reach the Premiership. In 2006 the side moved again, this time to the home ground of Camborne Rugby Club, before returning to Penzance in 2010 to play, once more, at the Mennaye Field. The club has twice reached the play-off final for promotion to the top tier of English rugby in seasons 2010–11 and 2011–12. Penzance was the home of Mounts Bay RFC, founded in 1999, originally as a team for local players who could not play for the professional Cornish Pirates. They won promotion seven times in eight seasons to reach the third tier of English rugby before folding in 2009 due to financial problems. The Pirates Amateurs are part of the Cornish Pirates and play in the lower levels of the league system. They ended their first season in second place in the Tribute Cornwall One and won promotion to Tribute Cornwall/Devon for 2011–12 season, where they continue to play. They also won the Cornwall Clubs Cup in 2010–11.

Penzance A.F.C. were relegated from the South West Peninsula League Premier Division following the 2012–13 season and now play in Division One West. The club was one of the founding members of the Cornwall County Football Association and the first winners of the Cornwall Senior Cup in 1892–93. Penzance have won the Senior Cup on ten occasions, the last in the 1980–81 campaign.

Former England and Surrey cricketer Jack Richards (born Clifton James Richards) was born in Penzance. He played eight test matches and was the wicket keeper during England's 1986 Ashes win in Australia. He learnt his cricket with the Humphry Davy Grammar School and Penzance Cricket Club. The cricket club was founded in 1829 and are Cornwall's most successful club having been champions on 23 occasions and have had more players play for Cornwall than any other club. The club currently plays in the top tier of the Cornwall Cricket League.

Penzance Wheelers, Britain's most south-westerly cycling club was founded in the 1930s. Their most famous member is Tom Southam who represented Great Britain in five World Championships. Penzance Wheelers predecessors was the Penzance Bicycle Club who were in existence in 1880 and, for example, on 30 April had a run to St Just, returning via Trewellard and Pendeen. Mount's Bay Harriers, a triathlon and running club founded in 2005 are based at Mount's Bay School, Heamoor. Athletes from the club participate at most road races and triathlons in Cornwall as well as many further afield. Other sporting clubs and organisations include Penzance Hockey Club, with male and female teams, based at the Penzance Astro Park, Penzance Tennis Club at Penlee Park and lawn bowling at Penzance Bowling Club and Penlee (Newlyn) Bowling Club.

The Mini Transat 6.50 (now the Transit 6.50) transatlantic yacht race started from Penzance (hosted by Penzance Sailing Club) from its conception in 1977 to the fourth edition of the race in 1983.

==== Cornish wrestling ====
Penzance has been a major centre for Cornish wrestling for centuries. Places where tournaments were held include: the Western Green, the Pentreath & Co's Brewery, the Folly, Penzance football club, St Just Road, Alverton, the field at Treneere Manor, the field behind the Golden Lion inn in the Market-place, St Clare Sports Ground, St Johyn's Hall, Mennaye Rugby Field, Ponsandane and Trereife House.

The oldest Cornish wrestling champion we know of was Stanton, who became the Cornish wrestling champion of Cornwall at a tournament in Penzance, in the fifteenth century. It is said that the wrestler was named this after chants at the tournament of "Stand-to-un, boy!"

W Sampson, originally from Penzance, was Cornish wrestling champion of Toronto in 1907.

Earnest Small, from Penzance, was West of England champion in 1906. He was Cornish champion in 1906 defeating Sidney and Reuben Chapman. He defeated Ahmed Madrali.

=== Media ===
The local newspaper is The Cornishman, published weekly. Outback, a lesbian newsletter, was self-published in Penzance between 1996 and 2008.

Local news and television programmes are provided by BBC South West and ITV West Country.

The local radio stations are BBC Radio Cornwall on 103.9 MHz FM and Coast FM (formerly Penwith Radio), a community radio station which is based in the town, and broadcasts on 96.5 and 97.2 MHz FM. There are two ILR stations for Cornwall: Pirate FM can be received in Penzance on 102.8 MHz FM, and Heart West on 107.0 MHz FM.

=== Folklore ===
When the area between Marazion and Penzance was mainly marsh, people tended to avoid the Eastern Green because of the "White Lady". She would jump onto a horse (already with rider) and ride pillion as far as the Red River, Chyandour (not the Red River at Marazion). Her identity and reasons for haunting are unknown. Mr William Richards of Chapel Street is reputed to be the last person to have seen her.

== Cornish language ==
Passengers using the station are greeted with a bilingual sign in both Cornish and English.

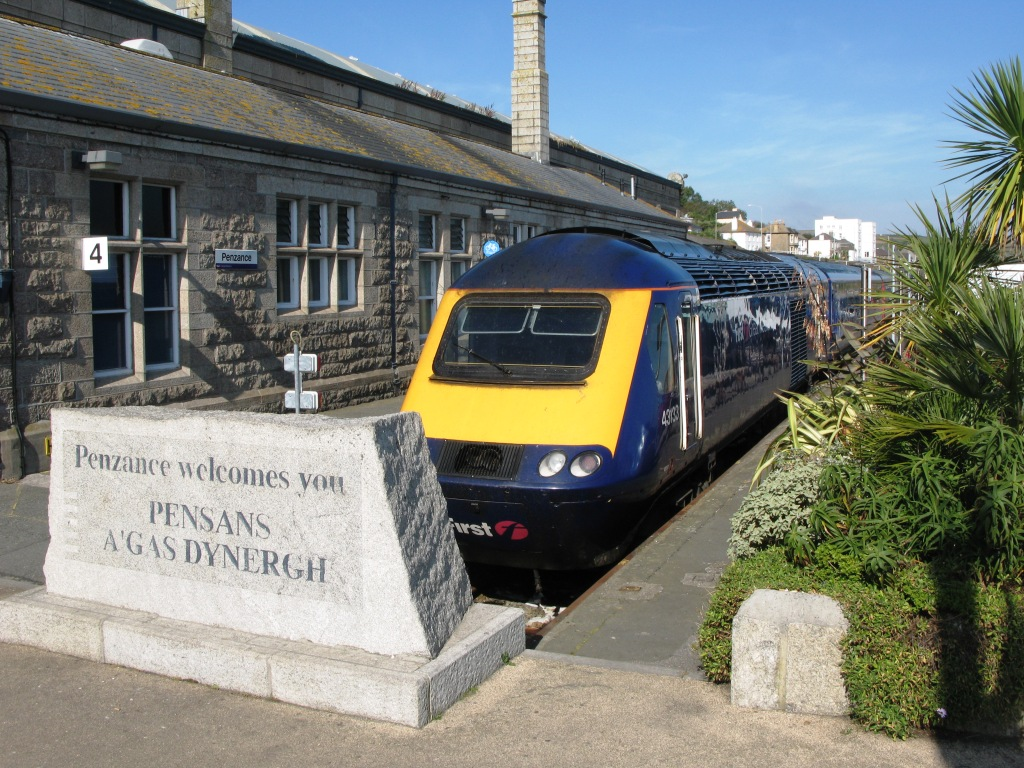
Cornish Language at Penzance railway station, installed by British Rail.

== Notable residents past and present ==
Penzance has been home to numerous persons of note, including actress Thandiwe Newton (born 1972), model Jean Shrimpton (born 1942) and cricketer Jack Richards (born 1958). Penzance was the birthplace of Maria Branwell (1783–1821), mother of three famous novelists – Charlotte Brontë (1816–1855), Emily Brontë (1818–1848) and Anne Brontë (1820–1849)

=== Sir Humphry Davy ===
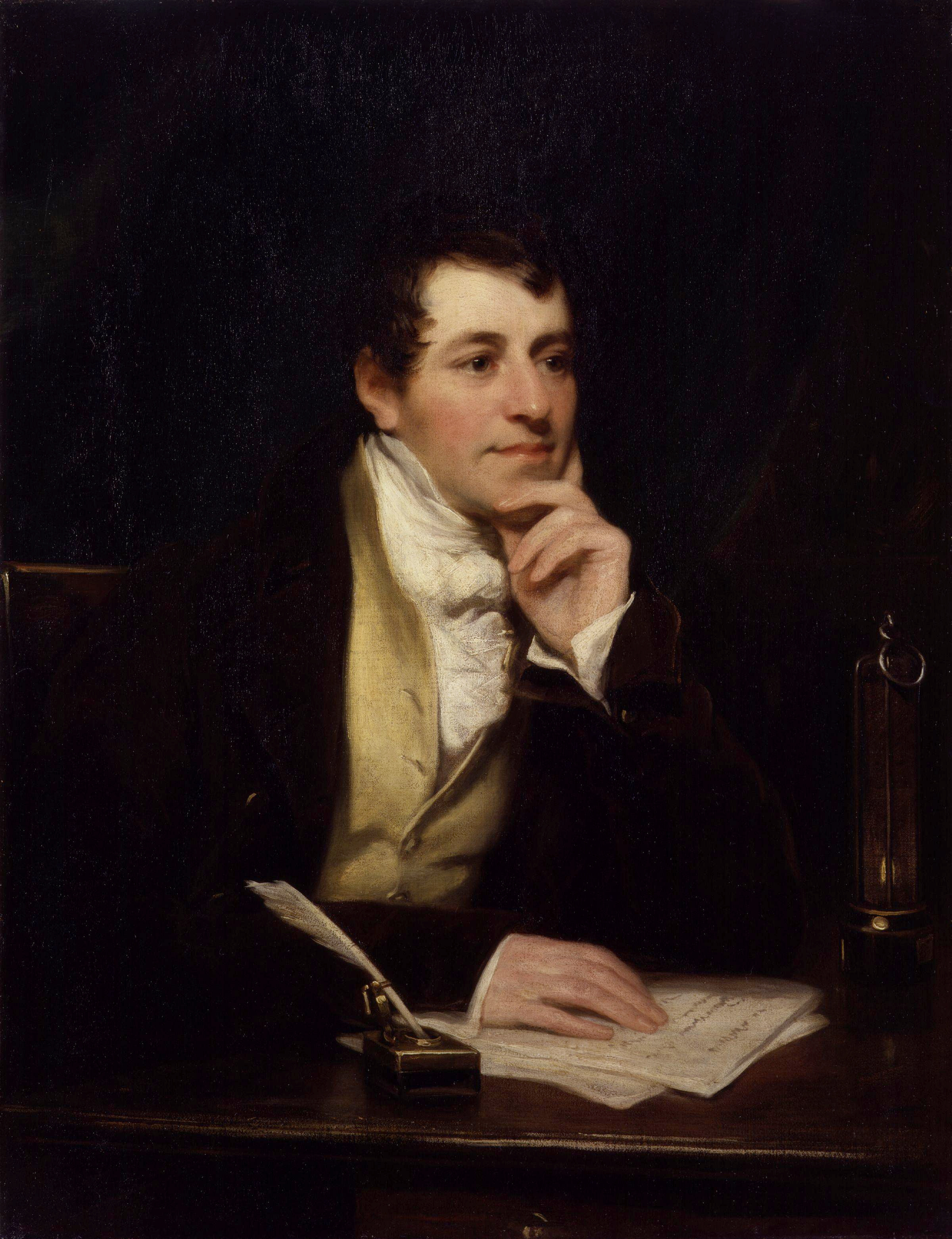
The celebrated scientist Sir Humphry Davy

Penzance was the birthplace of the chemist Sir Humphry Davy (1778–1829). He was President of the Royal Society; inventor of the process of electrolysis; the first person to isolate sodium; the first to discover nitrous oxide; and joint discoverer, with Michael Faraday (1791–1867), that diamonds are made of pure carbon. Today he is possibly best known as the inventor of the Miner's Safety Lamp, or Davy lamp. There is a statue of Davy at the top of Market Jew Street, near the house in which he was born. One of Penzance's secondary schools is also named after the scientist, and runs as a music and maths community college. Robert Dunkin (1761–1831), a Penzance saddler and maker of scientific instruments, taught Davy the fundamental principles of practical science.

== Twinning ==
Penzance is twinned with the following towns:

- Concarneau, Brittany, France
- Bendigo, Victoria, Australia
- Nevada City, California, United States
- Cuxhaven, Germany. From 1967 to 1974 Penzance was twinned with Cuxhaven, though between 1974 and 2009 this twinning arrangement was passed to the now defunct Penwith District Council. As of April 2009, the arrangement was reinstated.

== Freedom of the Town ==
The following people and military units have received the Freedom of the Town of Penzance.

=== Individuals ===
- 25 April 1958: Sir Edward Bolitho, Lord Lieutenant of Cornwall 1936–1962.

=== Military units ===
- HMS Penzance, RN: 2000.

== See also ==
- HMS Penzance
- The Pirates of Penzance
- Listed buildings in Penzance
