= Market Building, Penzance =

Coordinates: 50.118794°N 5.536731°W

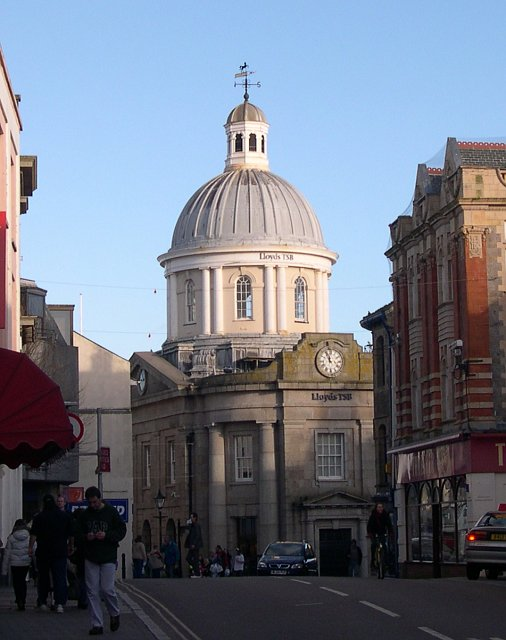
- West elevation of The Market Building
- Interactive map of the Market Building, Penzance area
- Alternative names: Lloyds Bank

General information
- Location: Penzance; Cornwall
- Construction started: 11 July 1836
- Inaugurated: 28 June 1838
- Client: Corporation of Penzance
- Owner: Lloyds Bank (1965-c.2006); Eros Properties Ltd. (2006-2023); Penzance Regeneration Company (from 2023)

Design and construction
- Architect: William Harris of Bristol
- Location within Cornwall

Listed Building – Grade I
- Designated: 29 July 1950
- Reference no.: 1221062

The Market Building in Penzance is a Grade I listed building situated at the top of Market Jew Street, Penzance.

== History ==
The site of the Market Building was bought from the Manor of Alverton for £34 as one of the first acts of the Corporation of Penzance after James I granted the town a charter in 1614. The site housed a market building, a guildhall and Penzance's prison. With alterations and repairs, the buildings lasted until their replacement in the 1830s. In James Neild's survey of prisons, he wrote that the prison in the market building had been replaced in about 1805, but it has been suggested that he was mistaken.

== Current building ==
=== Design ===
The Corporation of Penzance organised an architectural competition for the building of a new market building on the site of the original. Although H J Whiting of London won the competition, his design was deemed too expensive for the Corporation (at the time, local councils were subject to increasing Government control by the passing of the Municipal Corporations Act 1835 and it was decided to use a cheaper scheme). The second place design was widely unpopular and so the contract was awarded to Bristol architect William Harris instead. Whiting sued for damages when his design was not chosen and was given £300 compensation. Samuel Teulon was also among the unsuccessful architects.

The Market Building was designed to

direct its users attention away from the vulgarity of the streets and the uninspired and often depressingly ugly uniformity of the town.

Built from granite ashlar, the building is crowned by a lead-covered dome and octagonal lantern which is visible from much of the town, and from neighbouring villages. The eastern end consists of four ionic columns with a portico known as tetrastyle and overlooks a main thoroughfare of Penzance (which was once the A30) and a statue of Humphry Davy (erected in 1872). As part of the design, a quarter-chiming clock was provided by Thomas Hale & Sons of Bristol, said by the maker to be 'the largest clock in the West of England'; it sounded the quarters on two bells and the hours on a third bell. (A powerful clock was needed because two of the dials were 200 feet (61 m) apart, and the other two 36 feet (11 m) apart.)

=== Construction, opening and use ===
The foundation stone was laid on 11 July 1836 and the building was opened by the Mayor of Penzance Richard Pearce on the day of Queen Victoria's Coronation, 28 June 1838, though it may have started trading two weeks earlier. The building originally housed a market in the western half of the building and the guildhall in the east. The basement below the guildhall originally contained cells for prisoners, while the first floor was used as a grammar school from 1867 to 1898. The upper storey of the western end housed the Corn Exchange which also served a dual purpose as a theatre. The building's dome was at one time home to the Penwith Natural History Society.

The eastern part of the building remained as the guildhall until St John's Hall (200 metres (660 ft) to the west) was built on glebe land in Alverton and opened in 1867. The Penzance Grammar School (1789–1898) took over the council rooms and remained there until 1898 when it closed.

The building's west face was redesigned in 1925 with rounded corners to allow larger vehicles to turn the corner from Market Place and Market Jew Street.

=== Current state ===
Lloyds Bank took over the western half of the building in 1925 when they shortened it by some 15 feet and modified the entrance. The bank bought the building from the Borough of Penzance in 1965 for £35,000. The western half of the building is still occupied by a Lloyds bank and the shop units in the eastern half are vacant. Despite the bank saying it would repair the building in 2014 after the roof began leaking and the interior suffered water damage, leaks have persisted and the condition continued to deteriorate. In 2019 it was placed on Historic England's Heritage at Risk Register due to plaster decay in the historic interior and timber rot due to damp.

==== Renovation and repair ====
In 2020, the Market Building was included in Penzance's bid for funding from the government's Future High Street Fund, though it was noted that it may have to be removed and included in the Towns Fund bid due to feasibility problems. In June 2021, Penzance was guaranteed £21.5m from the Town Deals Fund and a further £10.4m from the Future High Streets Fund. The next month, a pre-application was made for plans to repair the ground floor of the eastern side of the building.

The Penzance Regeneration Company, backed by Future High Streets funding, acquired the building in 2023. In 2024, Lloyds Bank restored the exterior of the building, and restoration of the interior is due to take place in 2025.
