= Peter Liddle (artist) =

British landscape artist and sculptor (born 1940)

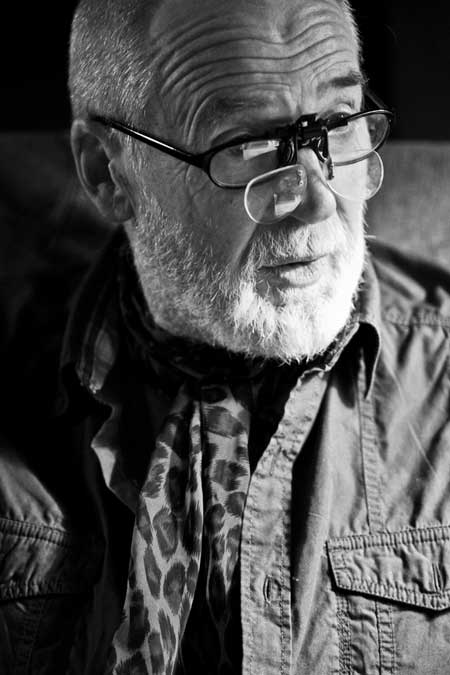
- Peter Liddle, 2011
- Born: 1940 (age 85–86); Blackwell, County Durham, England
- Education: Nottingham College of Art
- Known for: painter, sculptor

Peter Liddle (born 1940) is a British landscape artist and sculptor, known for his allegorical depictions of the British Isles.

== Biography ==
Liddle attended the Nottingham College of Art from around 1957–59 and studied drawing and art history under John Powell and smithing under the silversmith G.K. Kitson. Liddle befriended fellow students Keith Albarn and his partner, Hazel. After studying, Liddle lived for a time in London where he married the Marshal Scholar Patricia Moyer.

He also struck up a close friendship with the adult educationalist, Frank Turk, learning much from his experience of eastern spirituality. The pair met regularly and maintained a correspondence long after Peter left Cornwall and up until Frank's death in 1996. However, with the end of his first marriage in 1969, Peter left Cornwall and after a period of instability settled in the Lake District in 1971. He remarried in 1972 to Sandra Stone (born 1950) and together they had two children Sorrel (Stratford) 1973 and Jude 1975. Peter never fell in with a particular school after leaving Cornwall but exhibited at times with other artists represented by Godfrey Pilkington's renowned Piccadilly Gallery in the 70s and 80s.

== Art ==
While still living in London Liddle began painting the Cornish coast, three paintings from this period were selected for the Royal Academy Summer Exhibition in 1965. Later that year Peter and Patricia relocated to a studio in Cornwall where he began to experiment with acrylic paint, exhibiting regularly with both The Newlyn Society of Artists and the Penwith Society of Arts. Two of his closest peers while in Cornwall were the painters Margo Maeckelberghe and Jack Pender. During this five-year period Liddle's style changed completely. He credits the challenge of the incredible Portholland light in his transition from heavy, textured, oils to whiter, more transparent, acrylics.

Liddle is a British painter known for his allegorical depictions of the wild reaches of the British Isles. His paintings can be austere and unsettling, often hinting at something beyond the landscape they superficially represent. The award-winning author Sarah Hall has described the atavistic quality of his work as such, "He seems able to lay this place bare, restore it to its original form, its ancientness, its soul. Mountain ranges often seem prehistoric, or like dinosaur relics." When Liddle talks about his work, he frequently asserts that experience of nature and particularly stone, is core to his practice. He has been quoted as saying, "My purpose in life seems to have been to record adventures." He has exhibited nationally, including at the Royal Academy, and internationally. His work is held in public collections including both the Leicestershire County Council Art Collection and the Otter Gallery, University of Chichester. He has regularly appeared in the Cumbria Life publication and has also featured on several regional and national television programmes.

The Work of Peter Liddle
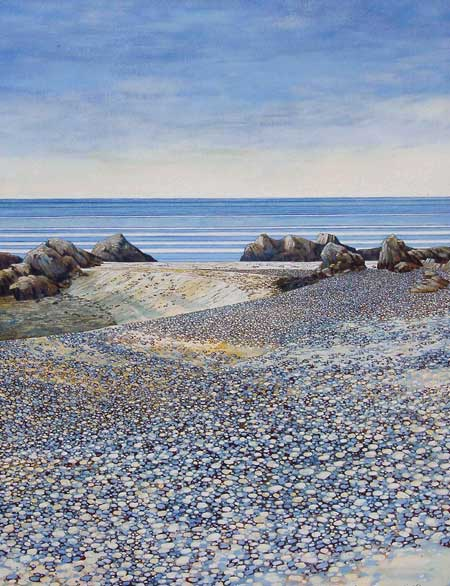
Mussel Shell Mausoleum (Peter Liddle, 1978)

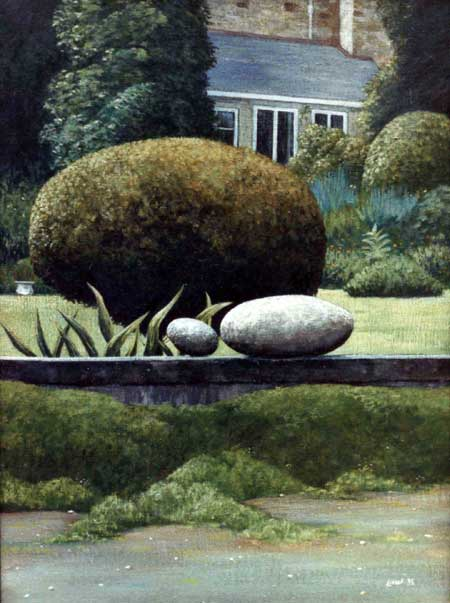
Cornish Garden No.1 (Margo Maeckelberghe's Garden) Peter Liddle, 1988

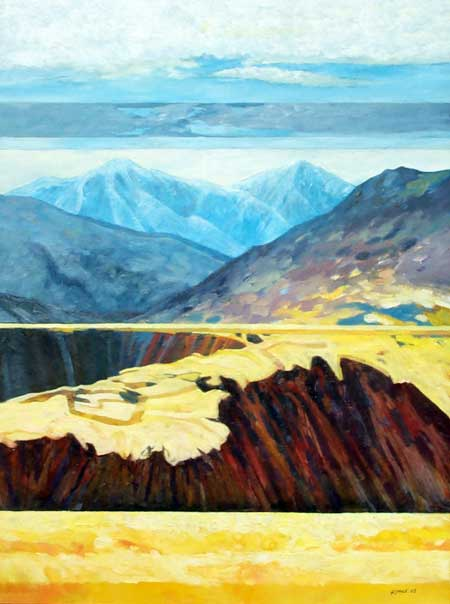
Red Cliff (Peter Liddle, 2003)
