= Listed buildings in Penzance =

Penzance is a town, civil parish and port in Cornwall, United Kingdom. As well as the town of Penzance, the civil parish also includes the town and port of Newlyn and the villages of Gulval, Heamoor, Mousehole and Paul.

== Key ==
Grade	Criteria
I	Buildings of exceptional interest, sometimes considered to be internationally important
II*	Particularly important buildings of more than special interest
II	Buildings of national importance and special interest

== Penzance ==
Name and location	Photograph	Date	Notes	Grade
Market Cross; 50.116345°N 5.540049°W		11th century (or earlier)	The granite wheelhead cross is 7 feet (2.1 m) high with all four faces decorated and two inscribed. The boundary of the Borough of Penzance (½ mile radius) was determined from the cross in 1614. Recorded in 1805, as the market cross and standing in the Greenmarket. In 1829 it was moved a few yards to stand at the junction with Causewayhead. Removed in 1867 and in 1899 the Penzance Natural History and Antiquarian Society erected it in Morrab Gardens. Moved to Penlee House in 1946.	II
South Pier; 50.116490°N 5.529532°W		15th century onwards	The first pier was built before 1512 with significant additions built on three alignments between 1740–87 and 1812–84. Built over a reef in different building styles, the evolution can be seen on the seaward side, preserving a series of pier-heads as the pier moved seawards. A variety of building materials were used including rough granite slabs, elvan and mine waste. The final extension was built between 1853 and 1855 (including a small lighthouse) and the wet dock was opened in 1884.	II*
Coombe Cottage; 50.127980°N 5.534098°W	—	17th/18th century	Former two-storey cottage with walls of colour-washed rubble, end chimney stacks and thatched roof. Central door with a modern porch and two windows with small horizontal sliding sashes with glazing bars. In a ruinous condition.	II
Hawk's Farm House; 50.117133°N 5.545666°W	—	17th/18th century	Two-storey thatched cottage with stuccoed uncoursed rubble walls and a central doorway. The roof has gable ends and eyebrow eaves over the first floor windows. Small two-light casements with thick glazing bars.	II
Rosecadgehill House; 50.123363°N 5.554298°W	—	17/18th century	Granite ashlar, two-storey country house possibly built in 1699. Wooden pilastered and pedimented Doric porch leads to a panelled entrance hall and a contemporary staircase. There is a slate hipped mansard roof with wide eaves and two large attic windows are flat-topped with slate hung cheeks. Five windows have sashes with glazing bars and revealed casing.	II*
Tredarvah Farm House; 50.117032°N 5.550418°W	—	17/18th century	Two-storey stuccoed rubble and cob cottage with thatched roof and gable ends. Two windows with wide spaced small sashes with glazing bars.	II
Boundary Stone in front of No. 8 Chyandour Cliff; 50.124626°N 5.529740°W		1687	One of two remaining 17th-century inscribed, granite boundary stones, set in the footpath at 8 Chyandour Cliff. The 74 cm tall stone is rectangular with a rounded top. There are rectangular recesses on three faces and there is a raised inscription where the stone has been cut back. The lettering is rounded and worn and reads ″P 1687.″ The original four stones cost £1 19s 6d to make and £1 10s 0d to erect and were placed on the main roads into Penzance.	II
Boundary Stone at the entrance to St Clare Cricket Gournd; 50.123285°N 5.546345°W		1687	A 17th-century boundary stone marking the boundary of the former Borough of Penzance (1614–1934). The granite stone is set within a stone wall at the entrance to St Clare cricket ground. It is 64 cm tall and there are rectangular recesses on three faces leaving raised, rounded and worn lettering °P 16 87°. There is a metal pin at the top and a bench mark on the front face.	II
The Vicarage, 24 Chapel Street; 50.116739°N 5.5339959°W	—	1701 (possibly)	Three-storey vicarage with granite ashlar walls and slate hipped roof. Open entrance porch on the southern side of the house with two fluted Ionic columns and key motif frieze doorcase with fielded panel reveals. Inside is a staircase with turned balusters, Tuscan columns and panelled dado.	II
Foster Hall; 50.118079°N 5.534165°W	—	Early 18th century	Two-storey coursed granite rubble house with slurried slate hipped roof and wide eaves. Three windows have large sashes with margin lights. Plain central doorway. Numbers 20 (Foster Hall) to 24 (consecutive) and number 4 Abbey Street form a group	II
Roscadgehill Cottage; 50.122907°N 5.554260°W	—	Early 18th century	A two-storey house with painted rubble walls, two windows with sashes and glazing bars and wide plain central doorway. Steep hipped, slate roof.	II
19 and 20 Alverton Road; 50.118333°N 5.540017°W	—	18th century	Two-storey terraced houses with coursed granite walls, three wide spaced windows, sashes with glazing bars. Slurried slate roof with hipped end. Rendered end wall to number 20. Included for group value.	II
Crownley, 15 Chapel Street; 50.117471°N 5.535521°W	—	18th century	Two-storey house of painted brick work in one string course and quoins. There are keyblocks to the ground floor openings and the central fielded panel door has a rectangular fanlight. Three windows have sashes with margin lights and glazing bars. Steep slate roof with gable ends, modillion eaves cornice and a central pediment with lunette and. Numbers 15 to 18 (consecutive) and the Methodist Church form a group.	II
17 Chapel Street; 50.117403°N 5.535363°W	—	18th century	Three-storey building with painted brick walls and slate hipped roof with modillioned eaves. On each floor there is one window which have sashes with margin lights. The first floor window is in a canted oriel bay with modillioned cornice. The recessed door has a cornice on brackets and panelled reveals	II
18 Chapel Street (former British Legion); 50.117302°N 5.535137°W	—	18th century	Two-storey building with granite quoins, one string course painted brickwork and modillioned eaves cornice. The central doorway and window above is slightly projected and the doorway has two Ionic pilasters and entablature. A two-storey extension to the right has granite ashlar walls and rusticated granite flat arch over double gates with fielded panels. Above the gates is a segmental bowed window with sashes and modillioned eaves cornice.	II
33 and 34 Chapel Street; 50.116756°N 5.533124°W		18th century	Two-storey houses with granite ashlar and pebble-dash ground floors, stuccoed top floors and slurried slate roof. Two windows have sashes and there is a left-handed canted oriel bay on the first floor. Of the two dormers, one is modern and the other hipped and the doors are in plain recesses.	II
41–44 Chapel Street; 50.116976°N 5.534058°W	—	18th century	The 18th-century group of four, two-storey houses have stuccoed fronts, with six windows, sashes and no glazing bars. There are three plain recessed doorways. The low parapet has a steep slate roof behind. Modern shop window to number 44.	II
Scranton House {45} and 45A Chapel Street; 50.116969°N 5.534087°W	—	18th century	Two-storey houses with semi-basements and attics. Five windows are in a central pedimented projection with modillion eaves. Number 45 has a central doorway with two Doric three-quarter columns, broken entablature and the pediment is restored and altered. Number 45A has a modern roughcast pedimental doorcase, two hipped and slate dormers.	II
48 Chapel Street; 50.117254°N 5.534728°W	—	18th century	Pebble-dashed two-storey house with steep slate roof and gable ends. Two windows have restored sashes and flat architraves. Modern door to the left.	II
52 Chapel Street; 50.117499°N 5.535201°W	—	18th century	A two-storey building with granite rubble walls, slurried slate roof and gable ends. The windows are modern fixed-light with small panes. Included for group value.	II
Admiral Benbow Restaurant; 50.117100°N 5.534280°W		18th century	Two-storey building with whitened granite rubble and raised pointing. Three modern windows with small panes on the ground floor. A 1959 fascia board of decorative character over the doorway. Tarred slates on the steep hipped roof. The 19th century smuggling gang, "Benbow Brandy Men", alleged to have served as an inspiration for the Admiral Benbow in Robert Louis Stevenson's Treasure Island, are known to have operated out of the Benbow and dug tunnels to the Abbey Warehouse.	II
Chapel House; 50.116688°N 5.532591°W	—	18th century	Two-storey hotel set at right angles to the road and forming a group with other listed buildings at the harbour end of Chapel Street. Built of roughcast walls on granite ashlar, stucco quoins and a string course. The slate roof has gable ends, modillion eaves and cornice. There is a modern glazed central porch.	II
Globe Inn; 50.117927°N 5.536830°W	—	18th century	Two-storey public house on a corner site with the gable end facing Queen Square. There is a parapeted gable end with ball finial and urn and two semi-circular attic windows. The first floor windows are in plain architraves with cornice over. On the ground floor is a segmental arched window.	II
4, Greenmarket; 50.118494°N 5.538139°W	—	18th century	Four-storey building with stucco walls, slurried slate roof, with eaves and soffit. Two windows have sashes with glazing bars. Modern shop front on the ground floor. Numbers 3 to 7 and the White Lion together with numbers 1 to 3 Alverton Street form a group.	II
83, Market Jew Street; 50.120657°N 5.534160°W	—	18th century	Two-storey cafe with rubble walls, slurried slate roof and plain eaves. Two windows have sashes with glazing bars. Door with panels and surround and flat roof. Numbers 81 to 83 (consecutive) form a group.	II
Phoenix House, 8 Parade Street; 50.117673°N 5.537165°W		18th century	Two-storey house of colour-washed brick, long and short quoins and slate half-hipped roof with modillion eaves and cornice. Five windows with keyblocks, sashes with glazing bars. Doorway has two Doric columns and open pediment semi-circular fanlight with gothic glazing bars.	II
Nancealverne House; 50.122760°N 5.553156°W	—	18th century	18th-century country house on the western outskirts of Penzance, built for the Carveth family. The two-storey building is built of coursed granite with chamfered quoins. Wide and panelled eaves with soffit and slate hipped roof. Five windows with flat arches and keystones, and sashes with glazing bars. The central wooden porch is glazed with corner pilasters and flat cornice.	II*
1 and 2, Abbey Street; 50.117548°N 5.533937°W	—	18th and 19th century	Whitewashed rubble two-storey cottages. The slurried slate roof is half-hipped. Three windows have sashes with glazing bars. Plain doorway. The Abbey Hotel and Numbers 1 and 2 Abbey Street form a group.	II
16–18, Alverton Road; 50.118352°N 5.533565°W		18th and 19th century	Three-storey building with coursed granite blocks and two small 19th-century shops fronts. Two wide spaced windows have sashes with revealed casing and there is a slate roof with gable ends. Included for group value.	II
1–4 Alverton Terrace; 50.118354°N 5.541036°W	—	18th and 19th century	Three, two storey, stuccoed wall cottages which have slate roofs with gable ends. Number 1 is now a pharmacy and has an early/mid-19th-century shop front with narrow fascia and flat cornices. Ground floor windows have small sashes and on the first floor two light casements.	II
5 Chapel Street; 50.117863°N 5.536361°W	—	18th and 19th century	Three-storey building with stucco roof, the upper floor has three windows with centre block, sashes and glazing bars. The ground floor has a large modern shop front. Included for group value. Numbers 5 to 11 (consecutive) form a group.	II
23 Chapel Street; 50.116791°N 5.534096°W	—	18th or early 19th century	Cement rendered three-storey house with slate hipped roof. Three windows with irregular fenestration and sashes with glazing bars. A right splayed bay window on the ground floor and the left side of the building slightly projects.	II
25–28 Chapel Street; 50.116652°N 5.533371°W		18th and 19th century	Row of two-storey houses of painted brick with one string course, quoins and granite plinths. Each has three windows with sashes without glazing bars. Flat pilastered doorcases with cornices. Maria Brontë (née Branwell) the mother of the Brontë family grew up in number 25. Numbers 19 to 28 (consecutive) form a group.	II
53 Chapel Street; 50.117559°N 5.535305°W	—	18th and 19th century	Three-storey building with stuccoed walls in two string courses and a steep pitched hipped roof with new tiles. The doorway has an open pediment, a semi-circular fanlight and two Doric, three-quarter columns with scribed quoin pilasters. Three windows have recessed architraves and sashes with glazing bars.	II
3 Greenmarket; 50.118537°N 5.538204°W	—	18th and 19th century	Three-storey building with stucco walls and a ground floor, large modern shop front on two elevations. Three windows have sashes with glazing bars and raised architraves. The hipped roof has new slates, wide eaves and soffit.	II
48–50, Market Jew Street; 50.121456°N 5.533614°W	—	18th and 19th century	Two-storey shops with roughcast and stucco walls. Three early 19th-century shop fronts with wide fluded pilasters and dentilled cornices. Six windows on the first floor including two elliptically bowed windsows with glazing bars. The other windows have sashes with glazing bars.	II
Alverton Cottage; 50.116731°N 5.547062°W	—	18th and 19th century	The stucco two-storey house has a hipped slate roof. There are six windows which have sashes with glazing bars and a porch with Doric columns, with shallow elliptical arches and flat cornice.	II
Stanley House; 50.118075°N 5.542866°W	—	18th and 19th century	Three-storey granite ashlar house with three light sash segmental bow windows on first and second floors. Doorways with semi-circular arched head. Simple eaves parapet. Numbers 7 to 14 and Stanley House form a group.	II
Trenarren, 8 Alverton Road; 50.118135°N 5.542007°W	—	18th and 19th century	Two-storey house with dressed granite blocks, three windows, sashes in revealed casing and vertical glazing bars. Central door, doorcase with cornice on heavy caved consoles. Slate roof with gable ends. Numbers 7 to 14 and Stanley House form a group.	II
10 Alverton Road; 50.118165°N 5.542279°W		18th and 19th century	Three-storey house with stucco, two string courses and central door with rectangular fanlight. Three windows with restored sashes and glazing bars, also late 18th-century square bay window at centre of first floor. The slate hipped roof has wide eaves soffit. Included for group value.	II
38 and 39, Market Place; 50.119081°N 5.536575°W	—	18th and 19th century	Ashlar three-storey building with parapet and coved cornice. Four windows with sashes, one with glazing bars. The ground floor has modern and late 19th-century shop fronts with doorway between them. Numbers 38 to 41 (consecutive) and Nos 1 and 2 Market Jew Street form a group.	II
First and Last Inn; 50.118124°N 5.540918°W		18th and 19th century	Three-storey Inn with roughcast walls and hipped roof with new slates. There is a central doorway on ground floor and windows with three light sashes with glazing bars. Other windows with have restored with sashes. The two-storey wing has two windows with sashes and glazing bars and a tarred slate roof with gable end.	II
Turks Head Inn; 50.117348°N 5.534734°W	More images	18th and 19th century	A two-storey public house with stucco walls and slate roof. Three light sash ground floor windows and a central door. Two windows with sashes above.	II
Battery and War Memorial; 50.114960°N 5.530933°W		1740	18th-century heptagonal, granite built platform, enclosed by a low retaining wall and attached to the mainland by a stone-built causeway. Some of the original vertical blocks of the causeway along the eastern side can still be seen. In the centre of the battery is a granite war memorial designed by Sir Edward Warren. It includes a square, two stepped plinth, with a pedestal surrounded by a low cast iron rail and surmounted by a tall obelisk. 207 people are named on the memorial.	II
12 Market Place; 50.082517°N 5.539662°W	—	Mid 18th century	Former town house from the mid 18th century which was remodelled in the mid to late 19th century. The property has rendered walls with a steeply pitched scantle slate roof and a brick end stack. There are two first floor windows over the shop front with cast-iron columns supporting the first floor. The plate-glass windows are framed by a cornice, moulded stall riser and right-hand pilaster. An early 19th century Tuscan column, probably reused provides support to left, to front of through-entry. The first floor has stuccoed quoining and moulded stucco architraves to plate-glass sashes.	II
Jewish Cemetery; 50.122743°N 5.535259°W	—	Mid-18th to 19th century	The boundary walls with the remains of the Bet Torah and fourteen headstones and tombs. The cemetery is irregular in plan with 2 m high boundary walls. A small roofless vestibule is believed to be the remains of a Bet Torah (cleansing house where bodies would have been prepared for burial). The earliest recorded plot lease is 1740, and enclosure began in 1811 and completed by 1841. Many of the headstones are of good quality and fourteen are listed. The earliest date on a headstone is 1791. The cemetery is believed to be amongst the best preserved outside London.	II
Treneere Manor; 50.127285°N 5.544430°W		1758	A small mansion built of granite with modillion eaves cornice, chamfered quoins and string-course. The two storey with basement east front has Tuscan three-quarter columns and entablature. The central doorway has steps with iron railings, a semi-circular fanlight containing a carriage lamp and a fielded panel door. The original slate mansard roof has been altered. There is a good interior with 18th-century wallpaper, fireplace, staircase, Tuscan column newels but plain balusters.	II*
The Old Penzance Theatre; 50.118030°N 5.535436°W	—	1787	Opened in 1787 by Richard Hughes, the theatre could accommodate circa 500 in two ranks of galleries around a central pit. The interior is much altered although the stage with trapdoors, proscenium and galleries survive. Some of the original joinery survives while other features such as the gallery support columns have been reused. The walls are made of roughly coursed rubble, with large granite long and short quoins, at the corners and around the openings. The north walls at basement (or ground) level have girders inserted for car parking spaces beneath the building and part of the building has blocked entrances, suggesting it was originally free standing.	II
58 to 60 Adelaide Street; 50.121209°N 5.534349°W	—	Late 18th century	Early 19th-century building with stucco walls and slate roof with wide eaves. There are four windows with sashes in recessed semi-circular headed bays. Segmental arches on the first floor with glazing bars to numbers 58 and 59 which also have ground floor shop windows with six and eight panes respectively, cornices and fascias. Number 60 has a central glazed door and two large modern ground floor windows.	II
7 Alverton Road (Alverton Practice); 50.118224°N 5.541772°W		Late 18th century	Doctors practice with steep slate roof with attic and gable ends. Two storeys with dressed granite blocks walls, three windows with sashes in revealed casing and glazing bars. Splayed bay window with cornice in the centre of the first floor. The ground floor doorway has a flat pilastered doorcase with entablature. Numbers 7 to 14 (consecutive) and Stanley House form a group.	II
29 Chapel Street; 50.116732°N 5.532784°W	—	Late 18th century	Three-storey house with granite ashlar walls, plain iron railings around the basement steps and slurried slate hipped roof. The windows have sashes and the porch has square columns.	II
30 to 32 Chapel Street; 50.116737°N 5.533055°W		Late 18th century	Two-storey houses with basements and attics and slurried slate roof with gable ends The double enclosed porch is approached by steps and has slender fluted Doric pilasters. On the left plain iron railings lead to an elliptical arched passageway with keyblock.	II
Castle Horneck; 50.117793°N 5.558013°W		Late 18th and early 19th century	Large two-storey house and basement with iron railings and slate hipped roof. The south-east walls are of granite ashlar with five windows, centre three break forward with pediment, and the north-west walls are stucco and have nine windows with sashes without glazing bars. The off centre open porch has Doric columns, an open pediment with panelled roof sofit. and semi-circular fanlight. Once home to the Borlase family, the building has been a youth hostel since 1950. John Wesley was arrested and held at the house in July 1745.	II*
Garden Walls At Treneere Manor To South West Of House; 50.127194°N 5.544665°W	—	Late 18th century	The kitchen garden of Treneere House is enclosed with red brick walls with a ramp coping.	II
Trevelyan House; 50.117427°N 5.535328°W	—	Late 18th century	Three-storey building of whitened brick with granite quoins. The door has a cornice on consoles and fanlight. Slate hipped roof with overhanging eaves. Numbers 15 to 18 (consecutive) and the Methodist Church form a group.	II
4 Abbey Street; 50.117783°N 5.53951°W	—	Early 19th century	Two-storey house with slate hipped roof and wide eaves. The central doorway has a retangular fanlight and a shallow wood trellis porch. Three windows have sashes with glazing bars. Forms a group with numbers 20 to 24 (consecutive) New Street.	II
9 Alverton Road; 50.118174°N 5.542150°W	—	Early 19th century	A two-storey stucco house with four windows with small sashes and slurried slate roof with gable ends. Modern ground floor multi-paned bowed shop window. Numbers 7 to 14 and Stanley House form a group.	II
13 and 14 Alverton Road; 50.118087°N 5.542740°W		Early 19th century|	Both houses are included for group value. Number 13 is a two-storey house with granite rendering on the 1st floor, wide-spaced windows with sashes and two doorways. Number 13 has a modern pedimented doorcase while number 14 has a doorcase with cornice on consoles. Numbers 7 to 14 and Stanley House form a group.	II
The Shore Restaurant and 15 Alverton Road; 50.118379°N 5.539652°W		Early 19th century	Granite ashlar three-storey residence and restaurant with steep slate roof with gable ends. Number 14 has a modern double fronted shop with bow windows and second floor casements. The ground floor of number 15 has reeded architraves and windows with sashes and glazing bars on the second floor. Numbers 14 to 20 (consecutive) form a group.	II
Buriton House, Alverton Street; 50.118249°N 5.540540°W	—	Early 19th century	Two-storey town house with granite plinth, quoins and stucco walls. There are stone steps with iron railings to the entrance, which is in a round arch with an inner arch with sunburst motif. On the west elevation are three windows (centre one blocked), the ground floor windows in slight recesses. The east elevation is slate hung, and has a circular stair bay, and the slate hipped roof has eaves soffit. Inside are rooms with dentilled and beaded cornices, window shutters with panels containing sunburst motifs. Doorways, windows and the staircase have reeded architraves.	II
1 and 2 Alverton Street; 50.118478°N 5.538449°W	—	Early 19th century	Three-storey building with large 19th-century shop fronts with flat Ionic pilasters, narrow fascia and cornice. Stucco walls and four windows with sashes and glazing bars. Numbers 1, 2, and 3, together with numbers 3 to 7 (consecutive) Greenmarket and the White Lion form a group.	II
London Inn, Causewayhead; 50.118958°N 5.537849°W	More images	Early 19th century	Three-storey public house, on a prominent corner site, with granite rubble walls and slate hipped roof. Windows have sashes, some with glazing bars. The semi-circular headed doorway on Causewayhead has a blocked fanlight.	II
5 Causewayhead; 50.119015°N 5.538015°W	—	Early 19th century	Three storeys with stucco walls, two single shop fronts with three doors in the centre which combine as one feature. The shop fronts have flat fluted pilasters, entablature and cornice. Four windows have shouldered architraves in relief, small aprons under the sills and sashes with glazing bars.	II
9 Chapel Street; 50.117774°N 5.536044°W	—	Early 19th century	Three-storey stucco building. The ground floor has two entrances, four Doric half columns, entablature and a tall shop window. Above are two Ionic pilasters, two string courses an eaves parapet with cornices and a blocking course. Two windows have sashes with glazing bars and there is one segmental bow window on the first floor.	II
10 Chapel Street; 50.117731°N 5.536017°W		Early 19th century	Two-storey brick building with granite chamfered quoins, blocking course, cornice and architraves with voussoirs. First floor windows have sashes with glazing bars, with the outside windows having margin lights. The large, ground floor shop front with central doorway is dated to the late 19th century.	II
11 Chapel Street; 50.117672°N 5.535859°W	—	Early 19th century	Three-storey building with a painted brick front and chamfered quoins. On the ground floor is a semi-circular headed, recessed doorway and a splayed bay window with modillion cornice on the first floor. There is one sash window on the second floor with margin lights. The slurried slate hipped roof has modillion eaves.	II
40 Chapel Street; 50.116822°N 5.533738°W		Early 19th century	Two-storey house with roughcast walls and doorway on the right with a pedimental hood on brackets. The first floor windows project through the eaves which have gable heads and finials.	II
50 Chapel Street; 50.117312°N 5.534905°W	—	Early 19th century	Two-storey stucco walled house with slurried slate roof with hipped end. There are right rescessed doors, a doorcase with corniche on consoles and narrow rectangular fanlight. A canted bay window on the first floor.	II
Kitt's Corner (formerly Lyscoth), 51 Chapel Street; 50.117331°N 5.535019°W	—	Early 19th century	Three-storey house with roughcast walls and slate roof. Windows have sashes with margin lights. There is a central reeded doorcase and the carriageway to the right also has reed casing. Included for group value.	II
Regent Hotel, 54 Chapel Street; 50.117618°N 5.535491°W	—	Early 19th century	Large three-storey hotel with an off-centre entrance with wide flat pilasters and entablature double doors and rectangular fanlight. The front elevation has stuccoed walls on granite ashlar plinth. On the first and second floors are five flat pilasters (paired at ends) with pebble-dash panels. Windows have sashes with glazing bars and there is a granite ashlar parapet and cornice below the roof. On the side elevation is a wide blocked doorway with ornate Adam style fanlight.	II
56 and 57 Chapel Street; 50.117758°N 5.535787°W	—	Early 19th century	Rendered three-storey building with string courses and parapet. Five windows, centre blocked sashes with glazing bars. Central rectangular carriageway and modern shop window to the right. Included for group value only.	II
Union Hotel, 61 Chapel Street; 50.117973°N 5.536169°W		Early 19th century	Three-storey hotel with stucco walls and a wide recessed doorway, on the right, which was originally a carriageway. The ground floor is plain with flat Ionic pilasters above. Around the eaves there is a parapet with scrolled and decorated blocking course which is slightly pedimented. There are sill aprons to second floor windows which have sashes with glazing bars. Ground floor windows are in slight recesses. Internally the large Assembly Room (1791) is approximately 23 feet (7.0 m) high with large semi-circular headed windows and a vaulted ceiling with dentilled cornice. There is a balustraded gallery with elliptical arch and the fireplace has Tuscan columns. At the rear of the building is an Art Nouveau bar.	II*
68 Chapel Street (formerly Cresta Silks); 50.118123°N 5.536768°W		Early 19th century	Shop on ground floor with two-storey stucco walls in string courses and flat end pilasters. Two windows with sashes and glazing bars. Late 19th-century double-fronted shop with large end consoles. Forms a group with numbers 9 to 14 (consecutive) Market Place.	II
2 and 3 Clarence Street; 50.119079°N 5.539307°W		Early 19th century	Two, early 19th-century, three-storey houses with stucco walls and slate hipped roof, eaves and a soffit. Two windows have sashes and number 2 has glazing bars. Both have recessed doorways and number 2 has rectangular fanlight. Numbers 2 to 21 (consecutive) and the Baptist Chapel form a good group.	II
4 to 21 Clarence Street; 50.119922°N 5.539631°W	—	Early 19th century	Row of three storey, single-fronted houses with stucco walls (except numbers 6 and 8 which are roughcast) and slate roofs with eaves soffits. Most of the windows have sashes with glazing bars and small sill aprons. Numbers 4 to 7, 9, 11 and 14 have small lathed and fretted porches.	II
1 to 5 Clarence Terrace; 50.120770°N 5.540066°W	—	Early 19th century	Row of small two-storey houses with one string course stucco walls. The slurried slate roof has hipped ends and panelled eaves with soffit. Numbers 1 and 4 have porches with Tuscan columns.	II
8–12 Cornwall Terrace; 50.114686°N 5.538787°W	—	Early 19th century	Two-storey terrace of small houses with slate hipped roof and wide eaves soffit. Numbers 8 has roughcast walls, 9 is pebble-dashed and 10 to 12 stucco. Each has two windows with round headed recesses and sashes with glazing bars.	II
13 and 14 Cornwall Terrace; 50.114511°N 5.538760°W	—	Early 19th century	Stuccoed and pebble-dash, three-storey houses with the end elevation slate hung. Four windows (two on second floor blocked) sashes with glazing bars. Plain round headed doorways. Slate hipped roof. Numbers 1 to 24 (consecutive) form a group.	II
15 to 17 Cornwall Terrace; 50.114383°N 5.538744°W	—	Early 19th century	Two-storey houses with attics, slate roofs and wide eaves. Numbers 15 and 16 have stucco walls while number 17 is pebble-dashed. There are three hipped dormer windows and five windows with sashes and glazing bars on the first floor. The ground floor windows are in round headed recesses. There are semi-circular headed doorways with fanlights and number 17 has a gabled hood.	II
18 Cornwall Terrace; 50.114289°N 5.538688°W	—	Early 19th century	Granite ashlar, three-storey terrace house with slate hipped roof and wide eaves. One window has sashes with glazing bars. There is an open porch with Tuscan columns and entablature.	II
19 to 21 Cornwall Terrace; 50.114289°N 5.538688°W	—	Early 19th century	Three terraced houses either pebble-dash or stucco walls and slate roofs with wide eaves. Number 19 has window sashes with glazing bars. Number 20 has a ground floor splayed bay window. Included for group value.	II
The Willows, Cornwall Terrace; 50.114427°N 5.538936°W	—	Early 19th century	Guesthouse with roughcast walls in a string course, end pilasters and a slate hipped roof with moulded eaves soffit. The central doorway has engaged fluted Ionic columns, entablature with wide cornice and a rectangular fanlight with intersecting glazing bars. There is a lean-to on the left-hand side and the northern elevation is splayed with two windows in recessed architraves. At the rear of the building is a slate hung circular stair bay with tall curved sash stair window.	II
5 Greenmarket; 50.118475°N 5.537985°W	—	Early 19th century	Three-storey building with stucco wall and a modern shop front. Slate hipped roof with wide-eaves soffit. Two windows have sashes with glazing bars and there are moulded architraves on the second floor. Numbers 3 to 7 (consecutive) and the White Lion Hotel together with numbers 1 to 3 (consecutive) Alverton Street form a group.	II
6 Greenmarket; 50.118464°N 5.537882°W	—	Early 19th century	The walls of the three-storey building are hung in slate and have painted walls. The gable is treated as a pediment and there are two windows, which have sashes with glazing bars which expose the casing. The shop front is set back and has reeded framing to the windows and a central doorway. In front are four supporting square fluted columns with frieze and modillion cornice above.	II
7 Greenmarket; 50.118517°N 5.537715°W	—	Early 19th century	Three-storey building with stucco walls and a modern multi-pane bow fronted shop window with flat cornice above. The slate hipped roof has wide eaves soffit. There is an exposed casing panel between the first floor windows which have sashes with glazing bars. Wide double doors to the right.	II
White Lion Hotel; 50.118496°N 5.537668°W	—	Early 19th century	Three-storey public house with painted brick walls and granite quoins. The slate roof has a moulded eaves board. On the left are two windows with sashes in moulded architraves, and are above a carriage way. The doorway is in a semi-circular arched, keyblock flat pilaster entablature with panel above, containing a white lion.	II
2 to 6 Leskinnick Street; 50.121994°N 5.533361°W	—	Late 18th century	Row of small double-fronted, two-storey houses with slate roofs and wide eaves. Numbers three and five have stucco walls, the rest are pebble-dashed. There is a one string course, fluted pilasters, recessed architraves and keyblocks. Each has three windows with sashes and modern doors. Number six has a 19th-century shop front with wide flat pilasters and entablature.	II
1 and 2 Market Jew Street; 50.119072°N 5.536293°W	—	Early 19th century	Number one has a 19th-century shop front with cornice and fascia while number two has a modern shop front with a large fascia. Between is a passageway with fluted columns. The walls are stuccoed and a parapet with cornice is raised at the centre. There are five flat pilasters on the first and second floors, and four windows have sashes.	II
5 Market Jew Street; 50.119168°N 5.536076°W	—	Early 19th century	Three-storey building with stucco walls and a modern plate glass shop front on the ground floor. First floor has a splayed bay window with cornice and sashes with glazing bars. Second floor has the one window with sashes and glazing bars, in moulded architraves. Flat panelled pilasters on the first and second floors and a slate hipped roof with wide eaves soffit.	II
13 and 14 Market Jew Street; 50.118184°N 5.536831°W	—	Early 19th century	Three-storey building with stucco walls and modern shop fronts on the ground floor. Paraet over the centre three windows and moulded cornice. Six scribed flat pilasters on the first and second floors, five windows and sashes with glazing bars. Numbers 11 to 14 (consecutive) form a group.	II
16 to 16A Market Jew Street; 50.119714°N 5.535159°W	—	Early 19th century	Three-storey shops (former houses) with painted render and rubble walls and a slate roof. The two shops are united by two panelled end pilaster and projecting modillion cornice. Number 16 has a shop front with granite dado and central inward canted entrance. There is one surviving ground floor pilaster. On the first floor there are three plate glass sashes in lugged architrave frames and three second floor plate glass sashes in plain frames. Number 16A has a circa 1985 inserted shop front and two inserted 20th century with two former window lugged architrave now joined as one and part filled in.	II
18 Market Jew Street; 50.119844°N 5.535008°W	—	Early 19th century	19th-century shop front with dentilled cornice and twin end pilasters. Three storeys with stucco walls, parapet and cornice. Three windows have sashes with glazing bars. Numbers 16 to 18 (consecutive) form a group.	II
10 and 11 Market Place; 50.118400°N 5.537009°W	—	Early 19th century	Two three-storey buildings with stucco walls and slate hipped roof. Late 19th-century shop front on (number 10) and modern shop window to number 11. Above there are five windows with sashes but no glazing bars. Two on the right on the first floor are in round-headed recesses.	II
13 and 14 Market Place; 50.118241°N 5.536894°W		Early 19th century	Two-storey stucco building with tall ground floor recessed shop windows and central entrance fascia which is supported with two slender cast iron columns. Pediment above. Two large windows with large sashes and glazing bars. Later addition three storeys with one window to the left.	II
40 and 41 Market Place; 50.119084°N 5.536396°W	—	Early 19th century	Rendered with bands on two storeys with end pilaster on first and second floors and two modern incongruous shop fronts. Three recessed windows, sashes, no glazing bars. Included for group value.	II
1 to 7 Morrab Place; 50.116782°N 5.538496°W	—	Early 19th century	Two-storey terrace of single fronted stucco houses with semi-basements. Each have flat scribed pilasters and band. Numbers 1 and 2 have semi-circular arched doorways. Numbers 3, 4 and 5 have open Doric porches. The fourteen windows have sashes with glazing bars, in recessed architraves, while number 7 has a later 19th-century splayed window on the ground floor. Numbers 1 to 7 (consecutive) and numbers 10 to 17 (consecutive) form a group.	II
10 and 11 Morrab Place; 50.117238°N 5.538662°W	—	Early 19th century	Two-storey houses with stucco walls, open porches, Tuscan columns, entablatures, and three hipped dormers. Two of the five windows are blind, the rest have sashes with glazing bars, in recessed architraves. Slate roof with gable ends, and wide eaves and soffit. Numbers 1 to 7 (consecutive) and numbers 10 to 17 (consecutive) form a group.	II
25 New Street; 50.117747°N 5.534149°W	—	Early 19th century	Two-storey house with stucco walls and a slate roof with gable ends. There are three sash windows with glazing bars. The central doorway has a recessed architrave. Numbers 25 to 29 (consecutive) form a group.	II
27 New Street; 50.117769°N 5.534476°W	—	Early 19th century	Early 19th century, two-storey house with a carriageway on the right framed with painted ashlar, architrave and cornice. The walls are stucco and the slate roof has gable ends, wide eaves and soffit. Three windows have sashes with glazing bars. The plain doorway has a rectangular fanlight.	II
28 and 29 New Street; 50.117913°N 5.534535°W	—	Early 19th century	Two painted, brick houses with granite quoins and rubble ends. There are three wide-spaced windows with small sashes and granite sills and the central carriage way is flanked by plain doorways. The slate roof has gable ends.	II
1 North Parade; 50.118134°N 5.538097°W	—	Early 19th century	Two-storey office with stucco walls in a string course and granite chamfered quoins. Three windows have sashes. The central doorway has a granite round-headed architrave with keyblock and fanlight. There are two slate hung hipped dormers. Numbers 1 to 27 (consecutive) along with Numbers 1 to 6 (consecutive) Parade Passage and Numbers 2 to 12 (consecutive) Park Corner form a group.	II
2 North Parade; 50.118134°N 5.538216°W	—	Early 19th century	A three-storey house with slate roof, two windows, sashes and glazing bars. Semi-circular headed doorway with fanlight. Included for group value	II
3 and 4 North Parade; 50.118110°N 5.538275°W	—	Early 19th century	Rough rendered, two-storey houses with attics (number 4 has a modern attic storey). There are four windows with sashes including restored glazing bars on number 4. Both have semi-circular doorways, number 4 has a shallow wood lattice porch.	II
11 to 15 North Parade; 50.118038°N 5.539061°W	—	Early 19th century	Three-storey houses which stucco wall (numbers 12 to 14 rough rendered) and slate roofs. Number 11 has a good three-storey segmental bowed bay window. Numbers 11 and 13 have shallow wood lattice porches and number 14 has two first floor restored segmental bays.	II
17 to 27 North Parade; 50.117896°N 5.540016°W	—	Early 19th century	Three-storey terrace, six with stuccoed walls and numbers 18, 22, 23, 26 and 27 pebble-dash. The doorways have shallow wood lattice porches, except 17 and 18 which have open porches with Tuscan columns and entablatures. Numbers 17 to 23 have first floor segmental bay windows and number 24 has a two-storey splayed bay.	II
1 Parade Street; 50.117931°N 5.536918°W	—	Early 19th century	Double fronted shop of three storeys with stucco walls. Slate roof with gable ends. There are two widely spaces windows which have sashes with vertical glazing bars and exposed casing. Included for group value. Numbers 1 and 2, the Seven Stars Public House (now The Smithy) together with Globe Inn in Queen Square, form a group	II
2 Parade Street and Seven Stars Public House; 50.117859°N 5.536960°W	—	Early 19th century	Coursed rubble shop and three-storey public house with slate roof. Number 2 has a mid- to late 19th-century shop front and there is a covered carriageway between the two properties. The Seven Stars has a cornice over two ground floor windows and the carriageway.	II
9 and 10 Parade Street; 50.117571°N 5.537546°W	—	Early 19th century	Two-storey office with rubble walls. The side elevation windows have round-headed recesses, and at the front is a Gothic-cum-Chinese doorway with clustered columns which support a pagoda roof in a round-headed recess. The slate hipped roof has overhanging eaves.	II
11 and 12 Park Corner; 50.117754°N 5.540421°W	—	Early 19th century	Three-storey houses with stucco walls and adjoining doorways in the centre with double shallow porch.	II
4 and 5 Prince's Street; 50.118259°N 5.535794°W	—	Early 19th century	Tall three-storey building with slate roof and wide eaves soffit. The stucco has been stripped from the ground floor of number 4 revealing the granite masonry, and the slightly projecting doorways have entablatures with cornices over. The first and second floors have three Ionic pilasters and the volutes of two are missing. Windows have sashes with glazing bars, in slight recesses.	II
1 Regent Terrace; 50.115927°N 5.535473°W	—	Early 19th century	Three-storey house with slate hung end and slate roof, gable ends and wide eaves soffit. Two windows have sashes and there is a shallow wood porch with enclosed sides, panelled architrave, semi-circular fanlight and flat cornice. Numbers 1 to 23 (consecutive) form a group.	II
2 to 5 Regent Terrace; 50.115858°N 5.535278°W	—	Early 19th century	Four two-storey houses with stucco walls and attic, except number 3 which is pebble-dashed. Number 2 has a late 19th-century two-storey square bay window. Numbers 3, 4 and 5 have shallow wood lattice porches with semi-circular arches. Number 4 has a large modern dormer, the rest hipped dormers.	II
6 Regent Terrace (Old Manor House); 50.115739°N 5.535017°W	—	Early 19th century	Two-storey house with basement, attic and slurried slate, half-hipped roof. Three windows from the late 19th century, are two storey, splayed bay windows with sash in between and glazing bars. The porch is open-work cast iron with semi-circular arch and key motif above, two slate hung hipped dormers.	II
7 Regent Terrace; 50.115834°N 5.534883°W	—	Early 19th century	Two-storey house with attic and a new slate roof with hung hipped dormers. Two windows on the first floor with sash and glazing bars and one on the right has a segmental bow window with margin lights. Ground floor sash window with moulded architrave. Shallow wood lattice porch with semi-circular arch.	II
8 and 9 Regent Terrace; 50.115714°N 5.534794°W	—	Early 19th century	Two-storey houses with rendered front and slurried slate roof. Numbers 1 to 23 (consecutive) form a group.	II
10 and 11 Regent Terrace; 50.1158427°N 5.534687°W	—	Early 19th century	Pebble-dashed three-storey houses with slate roof and gable ends. Two windows on the second floor have sashes with glazing bars. Number 10 has an early 20th-century two-storey bay window and number 11 has a first-floor verandah which is supported on Tuscan columns. Both houses have semi-circular headed doorways. Included for group value.	II
12 to 19 Regent Terrace; 50.115764°N 5.533982°W	—	Early 19th century	Two storey, medium size houses with attic and semi-basement, stucco walls and granite plinth (number 13 is pebble-dash). Windows have sashes with glazing bars and small sill aprons. Each has an open porch with entablatures supported on Ionic or Tuscan columns and have a flight of steps with plain iron railings. Porches at numbers 14 and 15 have been encased or replaced.	II
20 Regent Terrace; 50.115702°N 5.533333°W	—	Early 19th century	Two-storey terrace house with attic and basement. The walls are stucco with granite at ground level. The open porch has a flight of steps with iron railings and two Tuscan columns supporting a bay window which has splayed angles and sashes with semi-circular headed lights. At the rear is a central slate-hung, semi-circular stairway with two-storey semi-circular bay windows of curved sashes and margin lights.	II
21 Regent Terrace; 50.115623°N 5.533390°W	—	Early 19th century	Roughcast, two-storey terrace house with a central doorway and Tuscan columns which support a square bay window above. Three windows with sashes and flat architraves, and a slate roof with wide eaves and soffit. Included for group value. Numbers 1 to 23 (consecutive) form a group.	II
22 Regent Terrace; 50.115549°N 5.533492°W	—	Early 19th century	Two-storey pebble-dash house with slate roof, wide eaves and a soffit. Three windows have sashes with glazing bars. The central modern enclosed porch supports a square bay window.	II
Stanley Guest House, 23 Regent Terrace; 50.115440°N 5.533624°W	—	Early 19th century	Granite rubble two-storey guest house with half-hipped end on the slate roof, wide eaves and soffit. Three windows have sashes with glazing bars and revealed casing. The open porch has Tuscan columns and entablature, and there is a modern shop window on the rendered end wall.	II
11 St Clare Street; 50.121465°N 5.540737°W	—	Early 19th century	Terraced house with original double shop front with glazing bars. Double doors hinged in halves with rectangular fanlight, entablature with flat cornich over. Doorway on the left has a rectangular fanlight. Two windows on the first floor have sashes with glazing bars. Stucco walls and slurried slate roof, wide eaves and a soffit. Listed on account of the ship front.	II
1–4 St Mary's Place; 50.117088°N 5.537062°W	—	Early 19th century	Three-storey early 19th-century terrace with basements and attics. The walls are of pebble-dash with string courses and quoins. The slate roof has gable ends with wide eaves and soffit. Six windows, sashes and glazing bars with rectangular fanlights above the first floor casements and pointed arch panes. The plain semi-circular headed doorways have fanlights and there are three hipped dormers.	II
6–8, St Mary's Terrace; 50.116835°N 5.536568°W	—	Early 19th century	Three-storey granite ashlar block houses with semi-basement and attic. Plain semi-circular headed doorway features, with steps and iron railings, fanlights, intersecting glazing bars and three hipped dormers. Four windows have recessed architraves and sashes with glazing bars.	II
1–5, South Parade; 50.117250°N 5.538086°W	—	Early 19th century	Three-storey granite ashlar terrace with semi-basements and attics. Semi-circular headed doorways with fanlights. Five windows with recessed architraves and sashes with glazing bars. Slate roof with an assortment of dormers. Numbers 1 to 5 (consecutive), together with Numbers 1 to 9 (consecutive) Morrab Terrace, form a group.	II
1–4, Trewartha Terrace; 50.123162°N 5.534536°W	—	Early 19th century	Four early 19th century, two-storey houses stepped up the hill. Each has an open porch with Doric columns and entablatures. The stucco walls are in one string courses with scribed end pilasters. Windows have recess architraves and sashes with glazing bars.	II
7, Trewartha Terrace; 50.123756°N 5.536137°W	—	Early 19th century	The two-storey house has a slate hipped roof with wide eaves and the two-storey stucco walls are in a string course with scribed end pilasters. There are three windows with sashes and glazing bars in recessed architraves, a side entrance and basement.	II
4-8 Victoria Place; 50.117441°N 5.538752°W	—	Early 19th century	Two-storey stucco terrace with slate hipped roof and moulded eaves with soffit. Ten windows with sashes and glazing bars. Doorways of number 4 has a moulded architrave, number 5 a flat pediment, number 6 a shallow wood lattice porch, number 7 open porch with Doric columns which support an entablature with flat cornice with pendents. Numbers 2 to 8 (consecutive) form a group.	II
10 and 10A, Victoria Place; 50.117321°N 5.539034°W	—	Early 19th century	Two-storey stucco house with end scribed pilasters. The slate hipped roof has wide eaves and a soffit. Three windows have sashes and glazing bars and there is a large bay window on the western elevation. The central doorway has a shallow wood lattice porch.	II
Crown Inn, Victoria Square; 50.120962°N 5.534759°W	More images	Early 19th century	Two-storey inn on a corner site which has stucco walls and slurried slate roof with wide eaves. Five windows have sashes with glazing bars and margin lights on the ground floor. There is a modern door on the corner. The buildings in Victoria Square form a group.	II
2–18 Victoria Square; 50.120963°N 5.535296°W	—	Early 19th century	Numbers 2 to 17 form three sides of a square of two-storey houses, each with two or three windows. Ground floor windows have three-light double-hung sashes, some with glazing bars. The walls are in string courses, most of the houses have modern doors and the roofs are of slate. The east side of the square consists of former coach houses, and the three-storey number 18 has a stucco ground floor with a central recessed doorway with cornice and consoles.	II
Garage Premises between 5 and 6 Victoria Square; 50.121115°N 5.535236°W	—	Early 19th century	Corner dwelling and garage in Victoria Square. Stucco walls, window and modern garage doors on the ground floor.	II
Abbey Hotel; 50.117402°N 5.533996°W		Early 19th century	Originally known as Abbey House with a stucco front from 1825 and containing a building from the 17th and 18th centuries. There is a central projection, Gothic porch with renaissance moulds. Inside there is a room with 17th- and 18th-century panelling and a staircase with turned balusters, square newel and moulded string.	II
Alphington House; 50.118115°N 5.543997°W	—	Early 19th century	The former County Planning Office has granite rubble walls with painted brick front and granite quoins. The slate hipped roof has panelled eaves soffit. Three windows have sashes with glazing bars.	II
Alverne Hall; 50.117474°N 5.543440°W	—	Early 19th century	Granite ashlar house with plain relief architraves which link to a string course and quoins. There are two flights of steps from the garden to a terrace along the front of the house. The steps are to each side of a large elliptical arch of a semi-basement window. There is also a slate hung semi-circular staircase bay at the rear.	II
Alverton House; 50.116438°N 5.549244°W	—	Early 19th century	Two storey, large and irregular stucco house with earlier wing. The lattice-work porch is at an angle and has a datestone (1674) over the door. The five windows have sashes, some with glazing bars and the slate roof is hipped and valleyed.	II
Alverton Manor; 50.117491°N 5.544162°W	—	Early 19th century	Two-storey stucco house with two windows, sashes in architrave surrounds. Hipped roof with tarred slates, overhanging eaves with panelled soffit. Irregular fenestration on the west wing.	II
Clarence Cottage; 50.120936°N 5.541496°W	—	Early 19th century	Regency house with stucco walls and a slate hipped roof. On two sides of the house is a trellised first floor verandah, with two, two-storeyed splayed bays through the verandah.	II
Clarence House (formerly St Erbyn's School); 50.120603°N 5.540200°W		Early 19th century	The large house and former school is now a Natural Health Centre. The walls are built of granite ashlar with string course and quoins and the slate hipped roof has panelled eaves soffit. The windows have sashes with glazing bars and the wood and glass entrance porch has Corinthian columns and entablature.	II
Custom House; 50.116643°N 5.532012°W	—	Early 19th century	Former custom house built into a steep slope with walls of coursed granite rubble. The three storey, north-east elevation faces the harbour, and three windows have sashes with glazing bars. The north-east elevation is obscured by a two-storey loft wing which has an open ground floor with crude granite posts supporting a slate-hung, upper storey which has a slate hipped roof, two-light casements and loft doors. The south-west elevation is of one storey and two windows have sashes with glazing bars There is a central doorway with projecting plain granite architrave and entablature.	II
Egyptian House; 50.117855°N 5.536332°W	More images	Early 19th century	Three-storey house and shop built in the style of Egyptian Revival architecture. Three windows have battered half round corded pilasters and glazing bars. Coved cornices above windows, two obelisk caryatids. Lotus bud columns are on each side of the entrance. A coat of arms is crowned by an eagle. Numbers 5 to 11 (consecutive) form a group.	I
Lower Larrigan House; 50.112088°N 5.547623°W		Early 19th century	Early 19th-century Regency two-storey house with stucco walls in a U-shaped plan. Three windows have sashes. Entrance porch at the side with twin Doric columns, decorated frieze and flat soffit to cornice. Also a verandah along the front with three segmental fretted arches and curved lead roof.	II
Outbuildings at Lower Larrigan House; 50.112202°N 5.547651°W	—	Early 19th century	Two-storey stuccoed building with casement windows and slate hipped roof.	II
Premises adjoining north east of the Masonic Hall; 50.118287°N 5.535780°W	—	Early 19th century	Tall, three storey, pebble-dash building with wide central doorway, large double doors and flat pilasters. The centre of the building slightly breaks forward, there is a heavy cornice and parapet and end pilasters. Windows have sashes with glazing bars and plain architraves.	II
Nancealverne Lodge; 50.125048°N 5.548816°W	—	Early 19th century	Lodge at the entrance of the drive to Nancealverne House. Originally built on a split level site, it has been rebuilt following a fire in the 2010s.	II
Penhale House; 50.116284°N 5.535797°W	—	Early 19th century	Two-storey house at a right angle to Queen Street with a resticated ground floor. Walls are granite ashlar in a string course with quoins, cornice and parapet. There are three windows with flat arched openings, recessed architraves and sashes with glazing bars and a central doorway with rectangular fanlight.	II
Penrose House; 50.124168°N 5.530944°W	—	Early 19th century	Two-storey early 19th-century building with stucco walls, panelled eaves and slate hipped roof. One string course with corner panelled pilaster windows in semi-circular headed rescessed architraves with ogee arches inside.	II
Rosevale; 50.117307°N 5.539819°W	—	Early 19th century	Two-storey stucco house with plain corner pilasters and three windows, sashes with glazing bars. Slate hipped roof, with wide eaves.	II
Trinity House Depot; 50.116520°N 5.531595°W		Early 19th century	Built on the site of the yard where Trinity House prepared the granite for the Wolf Rock Lighthouse, which was first lit in January 1880. The two-storey former depot has stuccoed walls, a granite string course and long and short quoins. On the ground floor are segmental headed windows, and at the ends of the first floor are two splayed bay windows and also four windows with sashes and glazing bars. The slate hipped roof has wide eaves and soffit.	II
The Weeths; 50.118592°N 5.543164°W	—	Early 19th century	A granite ashlar two-storey house with slurried slate-hipped roof and panelled eaves soffit. There are long and short quoins, three windows with sashes and glazing bars.	II
West Lodge; 50.117565°N 5.543680°W	—	Early 19th century	Two-storey house with stucco walls, two windows with sashes, three full height pilasters. The ground floor windows are in recesses, the one on the left has a segmental bow. The doorway is on the left under a tented canopy with gothic glazing bars, sash above also with gothic glazing bars. Slurried slate hipped roof with eaves soffit.	II
White House; 50.123720°N 5.535916°W		Early 19th century	Two-storey house with stucco walls, slate hipped roof and wide eaves. Three windows with sashes and glazing bars in recessed architraves. The central doorway has an open porch with Tuscan columns and entablature.	II
Rosehill Manor; 50.120374°N 5.58162°W	—	1814	A country house built for the banker Richard Oxnam (1768–1844), altered and extended in the 19th century. The two storey, front and side walls are of granite ashlar and slate hipped roof and an elegant semi-circular open portico with four granite Doric columns and entablature. The front entrance door has two flanking windows with ornamental glazing.	II*
21 (Godolphin House) and 22, Chapel Street; 50.116873°N 5.534163°W		Early to mid-19th century	Both houses have a granite plinth and slate hipped roofs. There are five windows with large sashes, one with margin lights and there are glazing bars on the ground floor. Godolphin House (no 21) is built of snecked granite rubble with slightly recessed doorway with cornice, while no 22's walls are stucco and the recessed doorway has consoles.	II
35–37 Chapel Street; 50.116773°N 5.533207°W		Early to mid-19th century	Three-storey house with stucco walls and roughcast granite plinth. Doors with cornices on heavy cornices. Three windows with sashes and a slate hipped roof with plain eaves. Included for group value.	II
Gothic House, 1 Leskinnick Place; 50.114393°N 5.539232°W	—	Early to mid-19th century	Two-storey corner cottage with stucco walls, battlemented parapets and finials. End gable battlemented parapet with one first floor window with pointed arch below. There are octagonal corner pilasters with crenellated finials and pointed arched windows, with thick intricate curvilinear wood glazing bars.	II
9 Market Place (formerly Boots Chemist); 50.118492°N 5.536964°W		Early to mid-19th century	Former Boots the Chemist with a large modern recessed shop front with deep fascia on the ground floor. The first floor windows are in semi-circular recesses and the second floor windows have plain architraves. The walls are stucco with wide panelled corner pilasters and the slate hipped roof has wide panelled eaves sofit with paired-brackets. An important corner site.	II
18–21 Morrab Place; 50.116650°N 5.538034°W	—	Early to mid-19th century	A terrace of early to mid-19th-century granite ashlar houses. Number 18 has stuccoed walls, five flat pilasters from ground to eaves. Each of the three storeys has two windows with sashes and glazing bars. Plain doorways. Number 19 has an open porch with granite columns and entablature Slate roof with panelled eaves soffit.	II
12 to 17 Morrab Terrace; 50.116916°N 5.538317°W	—	Early-mid 19th century	A three-storey stuccoed terrace, built in pairs of houses with slate roofs, wide eaves and dormers. The walls of numbers 14 and 15 are pebble-dash. Windows of 12 and 13 have modern casements, moulded or recessed architraves. Numbers 14 and 15 have Doric porches and rusticated ground floor, while 16 and 17 have semi-arched doorways. At the rear of 12 is the two storeyed, number 12A which has a roughcast slate roof with hipped end. Two windows on the first floor have large sashes with glazing bars. The central doorway has a flat pilastered doorcase and rectangular fanlight.	II
10 North Parade; 50.118031°N 5.538869°W	—	Early to mid-19th century	Three-storey house with stucco walls, end pilasters and a slate hipped roof with wide eaves. To the right is a semi-circular headed doorway in a shallow open porch with two slender Tuscan columns and entablature.	II
1 to 12A Penrose Terrace; 50.122909°N 5.533108°W	—	Early to mid-19th century	Two-storey terrace houses with slate roofs stepped up the hill. Each has three windows with sashes and mostly with glazing bars. Numbers 1 to 7 and 11 have stucco walls, number 8 is pebble-dash and 9, 10 and 12 granite rubble. All have open porches with Doric columns and entablatures (except numbers 1, 2, 3 and 5). Numbers 1 and 2 have been converted into an hotel annexe. Number 11 has two late 19th-century, two-storey splayed bay windows.	II
Abbey Basin Quays and Slipway; 50.118105°N 5.533428°W		Early to mid-19th century	Dressed granite quays on the north, south and west sides of the Abbey Basin, along with granite bollards and slipway on the western side. The basin, viaduct and Ross Bridge are not included. Part of an unusually complete group of harbour structures, including the Abbey Warehouse and dry dock on the southern side.	II
Masonic Hall; 50.118206°N 5.535903°W	—	Early to mid-19th century	Three-storey building consisting of granite ashar with horizontal rebated joints on the ground floor and stucco walls on the first and second floors. Wide central doorway with a pair of ionic pilasters and entablature with cornice along the width of the building. Three windows with parapet and heavy cornice. Windows have large sashes with glazing bars. The Masonic Hall, adjoining buildings and numbers 4 and 5 form a group.	II
Trevear; 50.118308°N 5.41446°W	—	Early to mid 19th century	Three storey, former County Court, with stucco walls, overhanging eaves and slate hipped roof. Outer pilasters are panelled from the ground floor upwards. Cornice band on the first floor. Three windows have architrave surrounds and tall sashes with glazing bars.	II
Redinnick House; 50.115562°N 5.540046°W	—	1825	The granite ashlar house was built in around 1825. Consisting of two storeys with basement, the central porch has Tuscan granite columns, flat cornice and enclosed with narrow weather boarding. The ground floor windows have moulded edges, wide sill ledges and rough hewn soffits.	II
York House; 50.121867°N 5.545887°W	—	1825	Large two-storey house built for John Pope in coursed granite with moulded cornice and embattled parapet. Large stone obelisks above the parapet in the Egyptian manner. Two splayed bay windows with three sashes and intersecting glazing bars on the ground floor. The open granite porch has Tuscan columns and entablature with a battlemented parapet and a semi-circular fanlight with tracery. Extensive 20th-century additions at the rear (not listed) were built in 1931–32 for the West Cornwall School for Girls and became the offices of the Borough of Penzance in 1970 and Penwith District Council in 1974.	II
Conduit head 50.122040°N 5.533902°W	—	1827	A granite ashlar semi-circular headed niche with flanking flat pilasters. Date panel above on 37 Mounts Street.	II
1–3 Redinnick Place; 50.114393°N 5.539232°W	—	1830	Built around 1830 the centre house has on the first floor, a ″gothick″ pointed arch window with dripmould, pointed lights and glazing bars. On the ground floor is a square-headed casement with dripmould 2-lights with intersecting glazing bars. End windows have sashes with glazing bars and the slate roof has gable ends.	II
West Penwith RDC Offices including railings, Chapel Street; 50.116815°N 5.533496°W		1834	Former Rural District Council Offices with a tall, central bell tower of four stages with open rendered bell cote surmounted by a short pyramid spire. The walls are granite ashlar and the ground floor has rebated joints above two plain pilasters and two broken string courses. The entrance is to one side and has a single-storey porch with granite Doric columns and entablature. The iron railings around the basement well are included in the listing. Three windows have moulded architraves and sashes with glazing bars. The wing to the north-west has a slate hipped roof and has five windows with semi-circular headed sashes with intersecting glazing bars.	II*
Baptist Church, Clarence Street (including school room); 50.119236°N 5.539238°W		1836	Completed in 1836 to plans by Philip Sambell (of Truro) and slightly remodelled 1898–1905. The building is made of local rubble with granite dressings and at the rear is a brick stack at the right-end of the schoolroom. The roof has concrete tiles. The two-storey building has a rectangular aisle-less plan with a gallery to three sides. The front has a symmetrical, three-bay front in Romanesque style with stucco detail of round-arched moulded or moulded and carved openings. Above the central blind rose window is the relief inscription, BAPTIST CHAPEL and below 1836. The sidewalls have original tall round-arched sashes with spoked fanlight heads (except for one 20th century copy) and there are rubble relieving arches under the sills. The interior retains most of its original features and fittings. The school room at the rear is probably mid-19th century.	II*
Eastern Green milestone 50.127154°N 5.520151°W	—	1837	A white painted, 0.84 m high granite milestone on the A30, at the eastern entrance to Penzance. The shaft is triangular on a rectangular base and has a pyramidal head. Two rectangular sides of the shaft are inscribed with sans serif capital lettering and Arabic numerals. The lettering is painted black. An Ordnance Survey bench mark has been carved on the top of the stone.	II
Market Building; 50.118773°N 5.537036°W	More images	1837	Large two-storey building built in granite ashlar and topped with a lead-covered dome and octagonal lantern. Below the dome is a drum with alternating twin Tuscan columns and semi-circular headed windows, and entablature with heavy cornice. At the eastern end is a tall Ionic tetrastyle facade with a statue of Sir Humphry Davy looking down over Market Jew Street. At the west end is a central pedimented entrance (not the original) with curved corner bays set back with large engaged columns, entablature and raised pediment with clock.	I
1 to 21 Regent Square; 50.116259°N 5.534935°W	—	1840	A complete square of two-storey Regency style houses with stucco walls and slate hipped roofs with wide eaves soffits. Each has three windows with some, first floor centre ones blind. There are open porches with Tuscan columns and entablatures with flat cornices.	II
Abbey Wharehouse; 50.117169°N 5.533369°W		1840	A warehouse from 1840 (or earlier), which is a dominant building on the Abbey Basin. It is part of a group of unusually complete, Victorian harbour buildings. The north-east facing, three-storey building is long, narrow, rectangular and built into the cliff. The walls are built of coursed granite with ashlar dressing and the flat roof is of large slate slabs. There are broad, giant pilasters between the bays, rising from the quay to a cornice at second floor level. Inside, the floors are supported on cast-iron posts with stairs in the centre bay.	II
Love Lane Farmhouse; 50.114957°N 5.548431°W	—	1843	A much altered cottage that is said to be 17th century and appears to have been rebuilt in the 19th century. The cottage walls are colour-washed, plastered rubble and has a slate roof. Three windows have wood casements with elliptical headed fanlights. Carved on the doorway granite lintel is ″GDE1675″. The ″D″ stands for the Daniel family and was said to have been built in 1843 on the site of an older building with the lintel being reused.	II
Albert Pier; 50.119381°N 5.530156°W	—	1845	Long, straight, granite ashlar pier built in 1845 and extended in 1853. Renamed in 1846 following the visit of Prince Albert. The southern end curves into the harbour, the outer side has a raised wall and there are integral recessed steps on the inner side. Part of an unusually complete group of harbour structures.	II
57 Adelaide Street; 50.121222°N 5.534338°W	—	Mid-19th century	Former shop with round corner window, dentilled cornice and flat end pilasters. The walls are stucco and there is a curved slate roof and plain end pilasters. Three widows have sashes. Number 55 to 60 (consecutive) and number 42 Market Jew Street form a group.	II
11 and 12 Alverton Road; 50.118133°N 5.542428°W		Mid-19th century	Three-storey houses and office, with granite quoins and string course. Ground floor is granite ashlar with rebated horizontal joints but the ground floor of number 12 has been altered and is partly roughcast and has a glazed doorway. Four windows are in moulded architraves with the central two paired. The first floor has cornices and segmental pediments to centre two windows. Slate hipped roof with eaves soffit. Included for group value.	II
8 Chapel Street; 50.117763°N 5.536151°W	—	Mid-19th century	Three-storey building with stucco walls, quoins, parapet and cornice. Three windows with sashes, moulded architraves, first floor cornices and segmental pediment to centre window. The shop front is modern. Numbers 5 to 11 (consecutive) form a group.	II
1 to 6 Clarence Place; 50.120899°N 5.541135°W	—	19th century	A row of two-storey Regency houses with stucco walls, recessed architraves, scribed pilasters, parapets and cornices. Each has semi-basements, attics, open entrance porches with Tuscan columns and entablatures.	II
42 Market Jew Street; 50.121044°N 5.534031°W	—	Mid 19th century	Three-storey corner building with curved angle, stucco walls and slate roof with wide eaves. 19th-century shop front on the ground floor with heavy dentilled cornice entrance on the corner. The Adelaide Street elevation has three windows with sashes. The Market Jew Street elevation has a late 19th-century splayed bay window on the first and second floors.	II
23 Market Place; 50.118505°N 5.537367°W		Mid-19th century	The three-storey building with stucco walls and large modern shop front acts as an end-piece view up Market Jew Street. Massive Corinthian half-columns on the upper floors with pilasters, broken emtablature, balustraded. Three windows with sashes, cornices and consoles.	II
1 to 9 Morrab Terrace; 50.116986°N 5.537738°W	—	Mid 19th century	Two-storey terrace houses with stucco walls in string courses, granite semi-basements and attics. They have paired, slightly recessed entrances with flat pilasters and cornices. The first floor semi-circular arched windows have sashes and the flat roof is made of slate and has hung dormers.	II
9 North Parade; 50.118059°N 5.538791°W	—	Mid 19th century	Three-storey house with rough rendered walls and a slate roof with wide eaves. There is a late-19th century, two-storey square bay window, with heavy dentilled cornice and a shallow cast iron porch.	II
Raised Pavement in Market Jew Street; 50.119779°N 5.535014°W		19th century	Raised pavement along the north-west side of Market Jew Street, including the granite paving stones, iron railings and steps.	II
Churchyard wall 50.116005°N 5.533116°W	—	19th century	Granite rubble wall around the churchyard of St Mary's parish church, surmounted by iron railings with arrow head shafts. A high pointed arched doorway with year 1672 carved on the granite arch predates the present church. On the southside is a 4-centered arch and raised parapet from 1883, and the main gate on Chapel Street has four octagonal gate piers.	II
Methodist Church including Railings; 50.116979°N 5.535195°W		Mid-19th century	A granite ashlar two-storey chapel with seven windows which have semi-circular heads. The parapet is raised at the centre and has a cornice. The ground floor has wide semi-circular entrances with panelled double doors and fanlights and the Tuscan colonnade have entablature. There are projecting rusticated porches at the ends with pilaster quoins and semi-circular headed windows. The iron railings and lamp standards are included. The chapel and numbers 15 to 18 (consecutive) Chapel Street form a group.	II*
Morrab Library; 50.116364°N 5.537898°W		Mid-19th century	Morrab Library (formerly Penzance Library) is in a two-storey, early mid-19th-century stucco house which as an open granite off centre porch with Tuscan columns and entablature. The windows are sashes with glazing bars.	II
Store at Penzance Shipyard; 50.116920°N 5.532122°W	—	Mid-19th century	Circa mid-19th-century rectangular store with vaulted cellar on the ground floor. Granite rubble wall with dressed granite quoins, lower part painted. Flat roof. Part of an unusually complete group of harbour buildings.	II
Public Buildings; 50.116983°N 5.540221°W		1867	Opened in 1867 and locally known as St John's Hall, the original occupants were the Borough Council, Police and the Royal Geological Society of Cornwall. The imposing granite ashlar two-storey building has a flat Doric entrance porch with twin columns and a Palladian window above. Eleven windows with semi-circular arches with recessed architraves. The walls have two string courses, with eaves cornice with brackets and eaves parapet and keystones and quoins.	II
Davy Monument; 50.118934°N 5.536372°W	More images	1872	Sicilian marble statue of Sir Humphry Davy (1778–1829) on a square plinth with cornice with a rough granite base. Davy was a chemist, poet and inventor.	II
Former Warehouse; 50.120835°N 5.533126°W	—	1872	Three storey, coursed granite rubble warehouse with a rounded end corner and slate hipped roof. There is a central carriageway and segmental arch. Two light casements and two full height slate hung bays of a later date with large modern windows.	II
Penzance School of Art and Library; 50.117307°N 5.539819°W	—	1880–1900	An art school designed by Silvanus Trevail, completed by Henry White and associated with the Newlyn School artists such as Stanhope Forbes and Walter Langley. Bernard Leach and his sons established a pottery school in 1947s which is now part of the Truro and Penwith College. The original building (right bay) is a mixed English Domestic Revival styles which is joined by a Science School facade to the left (1886) which became a free public library.	II
Old Lifeboat House; 50.118669°N 5.533439°W		1884	The single-storey rectangular shed housed a lifeboat from 1885 to 1917. It is built of square-coursed granite with ashlar dressings and a slate roof. The double doors are modern, the lintel may be a replacement and there are three light oriel with granite mullions which are flanked by terracotta roundels with the RNLI crest.	II
Wesleyan School, Chapel Street; 50.117086°N 5.534762°W	—	1884	One of only two purpose-built Methodist schools for full-time education in Cornwall; the other being Truro School (for boys). The two-storey, former girls school has many original interior features including the roof structure and staircase. Built in granite ashlar in thin courses with a four-bay front and the entrance on the left. The porch has a round-arched doorway with panelled doors and an oculus above the first floor window. The slate hipped roof is behind a parapet with gutter as moulded cornice and there is a tall, rendered stack with modillion cornich to right-hand return.	II
3 Market Place; 50.118673°N 5.536569°W		1889	Built in Victorian Italianate style for the Devon and Cornwall Bank, to a design by James Hicks of Redruth and is now a shop. The ground floor has a grey granite ashlar, 3-bay arcaded front with egg-and-dart- extrados, panelled intrados, keystones and piers with large moulded capitals. The centre right pier is a pair of polished pink granite colonnettes with richly carved composite capitals. The roof is hidden behind the parapet.	II
Bandstand; 50.115685°N 5.537388°W		Late 19th or early 20th century	Octagonal bandstand in Morrab Gardens, with rusticated granite base, cast-iron columns and balustrade. The hipped lead-clad canopy has an ornate open-work, wrought-iron cage-design, finial and cresting over the eaves. Access is by iron steps. Morrab Gardens is a grade II listed garden on the Register of Parks and Gardens.	II
Penzance Dry Dock; 50.117506°N 5.532613°W		1900	Commercial dry dock built by Holmans and now leased by the Isles of Scilly Steamship Group. Excavated from bedrock and dressed with granite. Rectangular plan with tapered inner south-east end, the sides are battered with stepped revetments of large granite blocks. The lock gates are 20th-century replacements. Part of a group of unusually complete harbour buildings.	II
Fountain and Pond Walls, Morrab Gardens; 50.116535°N 5.537231°W		1901	A cast-iron fountain standing on a large pedestal which has friezes with scallops, sea shells and starfish at the base and above, dolphins, cherubs and turtles, spouting water. Above is a large gadrooned basin which has a pedestal in the centre supporting a smaller basin. Above the basin is a globe which supports an otter with a fish in its mouth. The plan of the cast-iron fountain was adopted by the Borough of Penzance in 1901 at an estimated cost of £160 and stands in a shallow pond, surrounded by a low wall of small granite boulders.	II
Boer War Memorial, Morrab Gardens, Penzance; 50.1163033°N 5.537649°W		1904	The statue stands on a roughly dressed, polished granite plinth and is in the form of a life-size volunteer soldier in khaki, wearing a Baden-Powell hat and leaning on the butt of his rifle. The rifle was replaced in 1996 following vandalism and the memorial was restored in 2002.	II
27B Market Place; 50.118566°N 5.537547°W		1905	Shop premises with chambers above in the Edwardian Free Renaissance style by Oliver Caldwell. There are three storeys, an attic and the roof is concealed behind a parapet. The ground floor, faces north, has a late 20th-century shop front with a large fascia board and a suspended ceiling. First and second floors have paired red terracotta ionic pilasters with rustication, masks and festoons, flanking tall recessed two-storey canted bays in yellow terracotta with Ipswich mullion winds and simulated tile-hanging. Above each bay is a small gable with a keyed oculus and a festoon below. A good example of an Edwardian terracotta commercial building.	II
Richmond Wesleyan Chapel; 50.122599°N 5.539863°W	—	1907	Nonconformist chapel designed by architects Gunton and Gordon in Late Free Gothic style with Arts and Craft influence. It is an accomplished example of a Free Style chapel with a clear departure from earlier Cornish chapel designs. It is built to a rectangular plan, without an aisle, and has a chancel flanked by an organ and vestry projections on the eastern side. The interior is unaltered except for the insertion of a screened entrance hall area.	II
Jubilee Pool; 50.114815°N 5.531554°W	More images	1935	A seaside lido, built on the Battery Rocks to the design of the Borough Engineer, Captain F Latham. The pool is made of painted concrete on a triangular plan with stepped terraces descending from the road level entrances. The concrete has been moulded to create a series of Art Deco curves and the design is considered to be the best surviving example, with the exception of Saltdean Lido, Brighton.	II
2 K6 Telephone Kiosks Outside Lloyds Bank; 50.118871°N 5.536449°W		Mid-20th century	Two cast iron type K6 telephone kiosks, designed by Sir Giles Gilbert Scott. The kiosks are square and have domed roofs with unperforated crowns to the top panels, and the windows and doors have margin glazing.	II

== Bibliography ==
- Hardie, Melissa (2000). Penzance. Penzance: Penzance Town Council. ISBN 1 872229 40 9.
- Pool, Peter A S (1974). The History of the Town and Borough of Penzance. Penzance: The Corporation of Penzance.
