= Sheffield, Cornwall =

Hamlet in Cornwall, England

Coordinates: 50.0868°N 5.5550°W

Sheffield
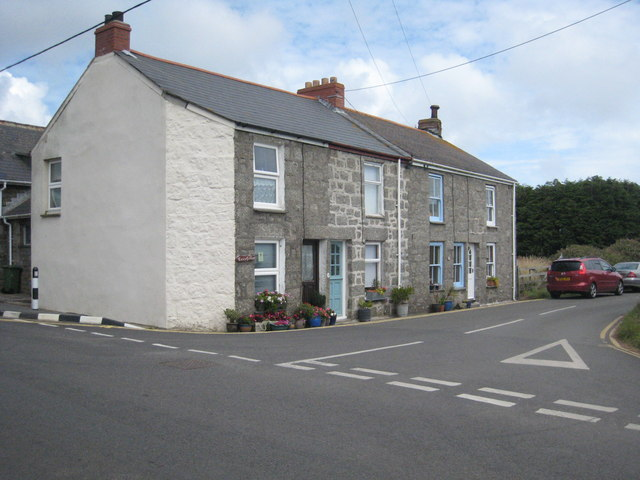
- Cottages at Sheffield

- Location within Cornwall
- OS grid reference: SW457269
- Civil parish: Penzance
- Unitary authority: Cornwall
- Ceremonial county: Cornwall
- Region: South West
- Country: England
- Sovereign state: United Kingdom
- Post town: PENZANCE
- Postcode district: TR19
- Dialling code: 01736
- Police: Devon and Cornwall
- Fire: Cornwall
- Ambulance: South Western
- UK Parliament: St Ives

Sheffield is a hamlet in Cornwall, England, situated near the village of Paul.

== History ==
Sheffield is thought to have been established to house the workers of the Sheffield Quarry and later the surrounding farms. The settlement was built along the road into Penzance where the quarry's stone had to be carted for shipment. However, the area is thought to have been inhabited as far back as Mesolithic (8000 BC to 4001 BC) and Neolithic (4000 BC to 2501 BC) times. Items from this era were recovered from an arable field at Sheffield Farm by Ian Blackmore in 2003.

The principal stone of the district is the well-known Land's End granite, which was extensively quarried at Sheffield Quarry, a post-medieval quarry dating from between 1540 AD to the late 1920s.

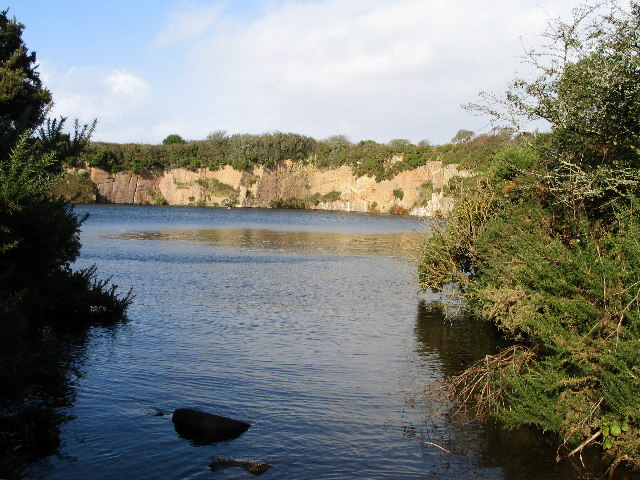
Sheffield Quarry

Sheffield Quarry's granite was highly prized due to its superior quality and strength. The quarry yielded a very coarse-grained grey granite with large feldspar crystals; the crystals interlock and lie in all directions adding to its strength, although this made quarrying more difficult it remained valuable as the margins of granite close to Penzance and St Ives did not yield such a good quality of stone.

After the Beerhouse Act 1830, a kiddlywink (or kiddle-e-wink), which is an old name for a Cornish beer shop or beer house, was thought to have been set up in what is now No. 2 Lower Sheffield and a paraffin store constructed next door (now No. 1). Kiddlywinks were reputed to be the haunts of smugglers and often had an unmarked bottle of spirits under the counter, however farm and quarry labourers were also known to receive beer instead of wages. Sheffield continued to grow and prosper until it was large enough to warrant a chapel and Sunday school.

The "Teetotal Wesleyan" chapel (a split from the Wesleyan Church), built around 1845, was later a New Connexion chapel and then converted to a Wesleyan School, it has now been converted to a house. A blacksmith at Sheffield is also shown on the OS map of 1875.

=== Artists ===
After the war Australian-born artist Barbara Tribe (1913–2000) moved into the old Sunday School in Sheffield, Cornwall, an area rich in artists, with her husband the architect John Singleman, and converted it into a studio. Tribe lived in the house for the rest of her life and worked alongside some of the most influential British artists of her time. She became a lecturer in Modelling and Sculpture at the Penzance School of Art, where she remained for 40 years, while her husband re-trained as a potter under Bernard Leach.

Many artists still live and work in the immediate area today due to the quality of the light, which has attracted artists dating back to when the railways made it possible to travel easily to the far West. Sheffield can be found just outside Newlyn, home to the world-famous Newlyn School and up the road from the picturesque fishing port of Mousehole.
