= Jack Pender =

English artist (1918–1998)

- Born: John Pender; 1918; Mousehole, Cornwall
- Died: 1998 (age 80)
- Resting place: Paul Cemetery Nr Mousehole
- Education: Penzance School of Art
- Known for: Painting
- Spouse: Madeleine Mann 1938-

Jack Pender (1918–1998) was a British artist.

Pender was born in Mousehole, Cornwall. He started to paint in 1936 and went to the Penzance School of Art in 1938. At the end of the war, he spent a short time in Greece at the Athens School of Art and then the Exeter College of Art 1946-1949 and then to the West of England College of Art, Bristol 1949–50. He was a member of the Newlyn Society of Artists and the Penwith Society of Arts, and exhibited regularly in St Ives (including at the Sail Loft Gallery), Newlyn, Plymouth and London. His artwork is in several public collections, details of which can be found on the Art UK website.

His themes are mostly the fishing boats and harbours around Mounts Bay, painted energetically, in styles from the figurative, to the near abstraction of the 1960s. At Art School he was known as "PZ 81" given his compulsive rendering of his father's fishing boat "the Lyonesse".

He was remembered alongside artists Patrick Heron, Terry Frost and Tony O’Malley in Margo Maeckelberghe's obituary.

The Arnolfini Gallery, Bristol gave him one man shows in the 1960s and he showed extensively at the Orion Gallery, Penzance and the Newlyn Orion in the 1970s. Several BBC films were also made about him and his life in Mousehole. In 1985 a work was included in the landmark Tate Gallery exhibition St Ives 1939–64. After this he was taken up by the Belgrave Gallery, London, Leon Shuddaby Fine Art, Penzance, and the Rainy Day Gallery, Penzance. There was a major retrospective of his work in 2008 at the Penlee House Gallery and Museum, Penzance.

He is survived by his daughter, the artist Tamsin Pender, and son Robin Pender.

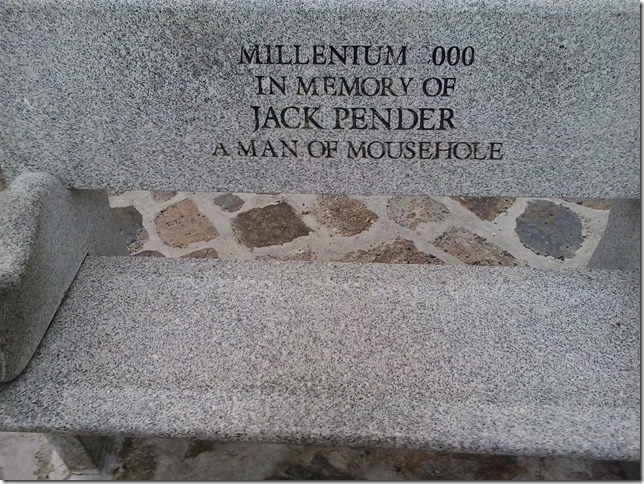
Jack Pender, "a man of Mousehole" memorial bench
