= Robin Welch =

English studio potter (1936–2019)

- Born: 23 July 1936; Nuneaton, Warwickshire, United Kingdom
- Died: 5 December 2019 (aged 83)
- Occupation: Studio potter

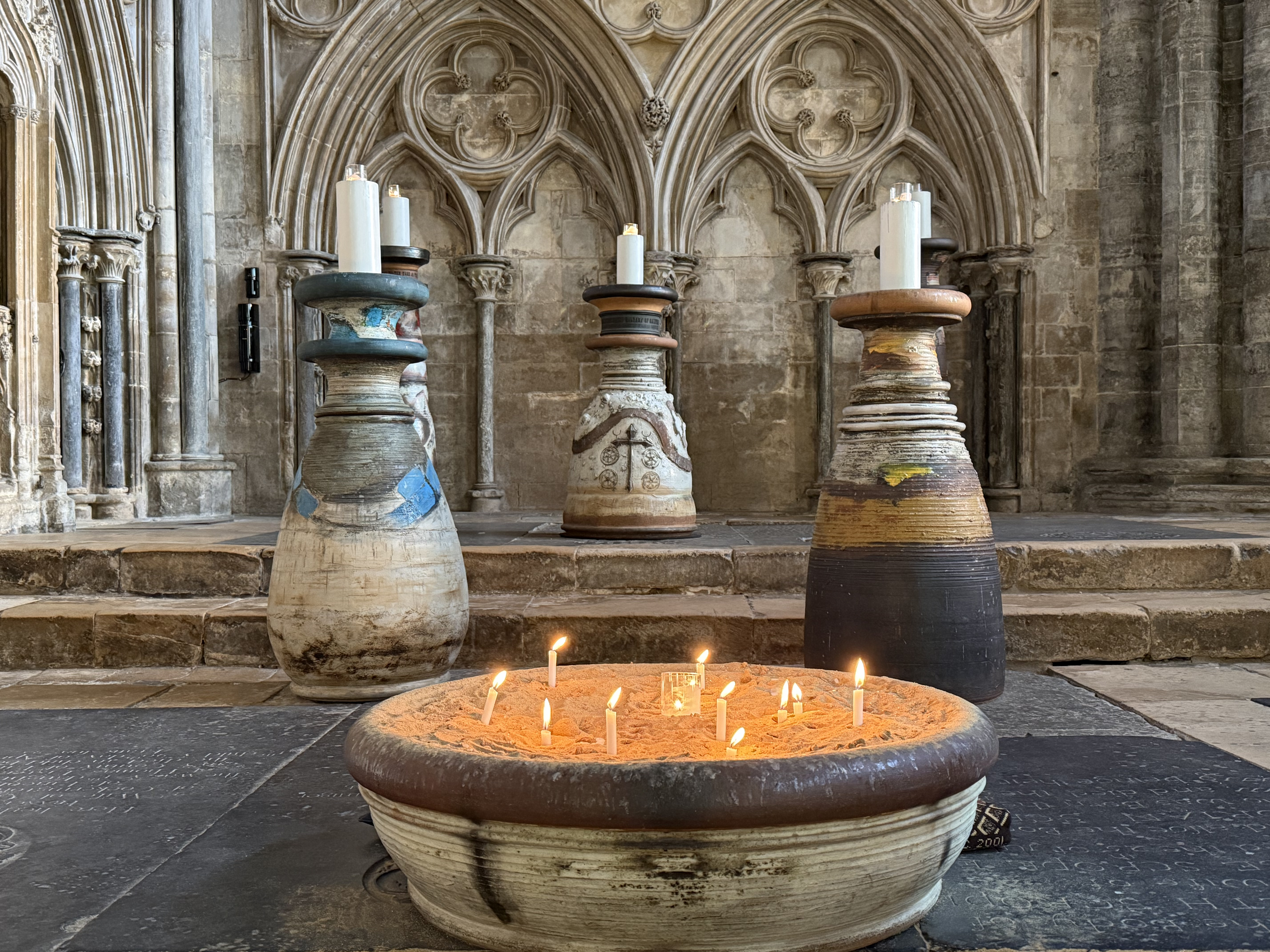
The Gilbert ceramic candle holders in Lincoln Cathedral created in 1985

Robin Welch (23 July 1936 – 5 December 2019) was a studio potter.

Robin Welch was born in Nuneaton, Warwickshire. In 1953, he studied art at Penzance School of Art in Cornwall, and in 1956 he studied at Central Saint Martins, London. Between 1953 and 1959, he worked at the Leach Pottery.

He moved to Australia for several years before returning to England in 1965 and setting up Stradbroke Pottery in Eye, Suffolk. He designed for Wedgwood, Midwinter Pottery and Denby Pottery Company.

His work is held by the Victoria and Albert Museum.
