= Margo Maeckelberghe =

English painter (1932–2014)

Margo Maeckelberghe nee Margaret Oates Try (11 August 1932 – 10 January 2014) was a Cornish Bard and artist.

== Biography ==
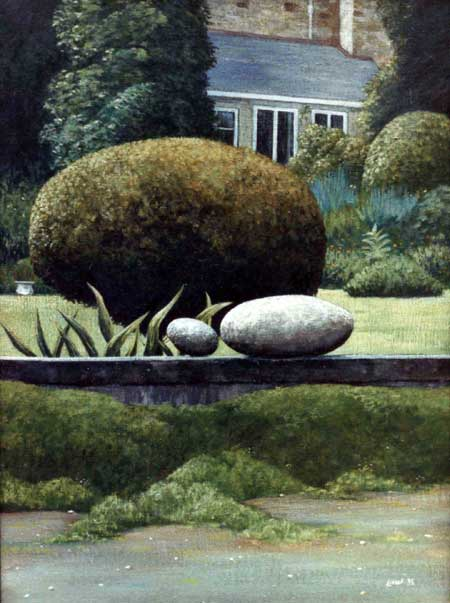
Cornish Garden No.1 (Margo Maeckelberghe's Garden) by Peter Liddle, 1988

Maeckelberghe was born in Penzance, where she grew up and lived for most of her life. She studied at the Penzance School of Art, and the Bath Academy of Art from 1949 to 1952. She returned to Cornwall after spending two years teaching in London and Gibraltar. Maeckelberghe was best known for her dramatic contemporary landscapes and seascapes in oil. For many years her studio was at "Carn Cottage" at the top of the moors between Penzance and Zennor. "For me, the coasts, seas, moors, skies and rocks of Cornwall offer inexhaustible painting material," she told an interviewer in 2008. In 1963 she organized the first show of Belgian artists in West Cornwall, at the Newlyn Art Gallery in Penzance. In the 1990s she was elected Chair of the Penwith Society of Artists and was elected a Cornish Bard in 1997. In 2008, "Extended Landscape," a major exhibition of her works, opened at Tate St. Ives.

== Personal life ==
Margo Oates Try married a Belgian-born doctor, Willy Maeckelberghe. They had two children, a son Paul and daughter Nico. Widowed in 2007, she died in 2014, aged 81 years.
