= Barbara Tribe =

Australian-born artist (1913–2000)

Barbara Tribe FRBS SPS ASTC
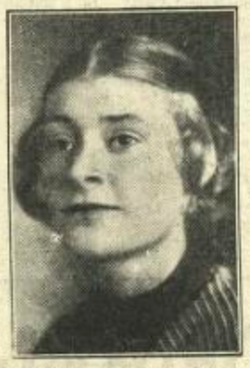
- Barbara Tribe, student, 1933
- Born: 20 June 1913; Sydney, Australia
- Died: 21 October 2000 (aged 87); Penzance, England
- Resting place: Paul Cemetery, Penzance
- Education: East Sydney Technical College
- Known for: Sculpture, painting, printmaking
- Awards: Jean Masson Davidson Medal from the Society of Portrait Sculptors

Barbara Tribe (1913–2000) was an Australian-born artist who spent most of her career in Cornwall. She is regarded as a significant twentieth-century portrait artist, working both in painting and sculpture.

== Personal life ==
Tribe was born in the suburb of Edgecliff, Sydney to English parents. In 1935 Tribe was awarded a travelling scholarship which allowed her to travel to England, where she lived and worked for the rest of her life. Tribe married John Singleman, an architect and potter, in 1947. They bought the former Baptist Sunday School building (later known as 'The Studio') in Sheffield, Cornwall in 1947 and moved there shortly afterward.

== Education ==
Tribe first studied at the Sydney Technical College from 1928 to 1933, joining when she was 15 years old and was awarded the Diploma in Sculpture, with Honours. After travelling to England, Tribe first attended the Kennington City & Guilds School of Art in 1936–1937 before being accepted into the Regent Street Polytechnic School of Art.

== Artwork and career ==
Tribe's work was heavily influenced by her travel experiences. During her time at the Sydney Technical College, she studied under English born sculptor, Raynor Hoff, and her figure work at this time was heavily influenced by him. After she received her diploma, she worked as Hoff's assistant and worked on the Hyde Park war memorial in Sydney with him. Between 1931 and 1934 Tribe often exhibited with the Society of Artists before holding her first solo show in 1934.

In the mid to late 1930s, Tribe and fellow Australian artist and actor Jean Elwing convinced Selfridges to provide studio space, and the young artist was also given parties by the store.

In 1943, Tribe was commissioned by Australia House, London to produce busts of seven distinguished airmen from Australia. Also in the 1940s, she began exhibiting at the Royal Academy of Arts and the Royal Society of British Sculptors.

During the Second World War, Tribe worked for the Inspectorate of Ancient Monuments, recording vulnerable historic buildings. Tribe entered a piece titled Embryo into the renowned The Unknown Political Prisoner exhibition (14 March–30 April 1953).

Tribe took up a part time teaching post at the Penzance School of Art after the war, and continued to teach there for over 40 years, retiring in 1988. Tribe was a member of Newlyn Society of Artists and St Ives Society of Artists.

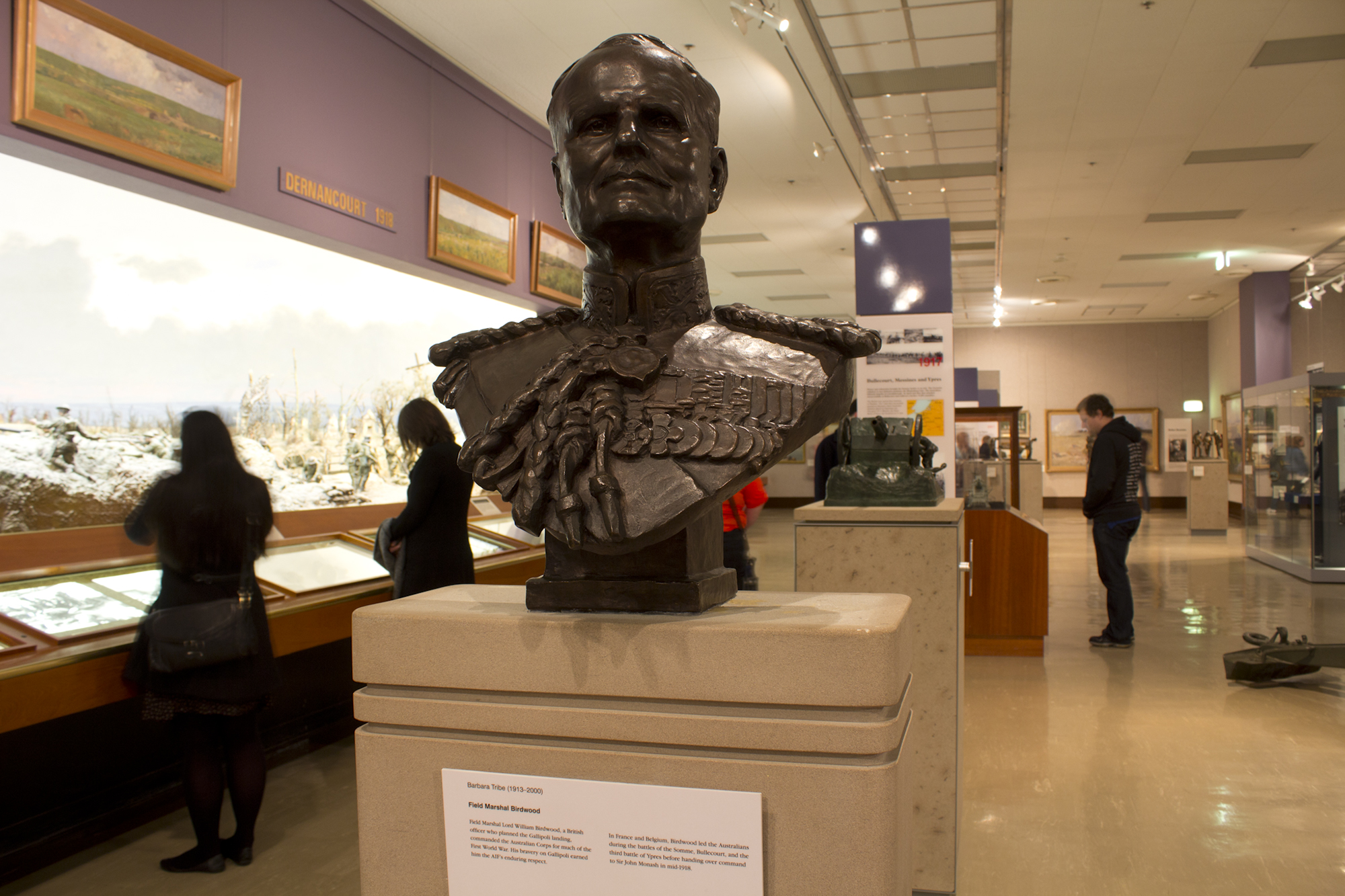
Bust of William Birdwood, 1st Baron Birdwood by Barbara Tribe in the Western Front Gallery at the Australian War Memorial.

== Selected awards and commissions ==
Tribe was a Fellow of the Royal Society of British Sculptors (FRBS), a member of the Society of Portrait Sculptors (SPS) and an Associate Sydney Technical College [now National Art School]. She received much recognition within her lifetime, including the following,

- Bronze medal for Sculpture, Sydney Technical College, 1933
- New South Wales Travelling Art Scholarship, 1935. Tribe was the first woman to receive this award. The winning entry was three pencil drawings, “Caprice”, “Balmus” and “Hands” and two sculptures, a plaster of “Caprice” and a bas-relief “Dust and Deity”.
- Jean Masson Davidson Medal, Society of Portrait Sculptors, London, 1998

== Selected exhibitions ==
Tribe exhibited widely throughout her career including the following,

- Solo exhibition, Fine Art Gallery (Anthony Horden & Sons), Sydney, 1934
- Summer Exhibition, Royal Academy of Arts, London, 5 May–26 August 1951
- Group Exhibition by the Staff of the Penzance School of Art, Newlyn Art Gallery, July 1982
- Alice to Penzance, the Mall Galleries, London, 19–29 July 1991
- This vital flesh: the sculpture of Rayner Hoff and his school, Art Gallery of New South Wales, Sydney, 26 November 1999–16 Jan 2000
- Australian paintings 1895-2002 and the European influence, Nevill Keating Pictures Ltd., London, July–August 2002
- The Elements within Sculpture, Lauraine Diggins Fine Art, Melbourne, 4 June–15 July 2011

== Works held in public collections ==
Artworks by Barbara Tribe are held in several public collections including the following works, sorted by year of creation. The unique ID no refers to the accession number or individual number given to each item by a gallery.

Title	Year	Medium	Unique ID no.	Gallery	Location
Medusa	1930–1931 (cast 1991)	bronze	409.1996.a-b	Art Gallery of New South Wales	Sydney, Australia
Medusa	1931 (cast late 1970s)	bronze	2001.41	National Gallery of Victoria	Melbourne, Australia
The Frenchman	1931	drawing	88.2100	National Gallery of Australia	Canberra, Australia
The spirit of the sea	1933	plaster & wood	221.2015	Art Gallery of New South Wales	Sydney, Australia
Lovers I	1936–1937 (cast 1981)	bronze	192.1982.a-b	Art Gallery of New South Wales	Sydney, Australia
Lovers II	1936–1937 (cast 1988)	bronze with green patina	2008.672	National Gallery of Australia	Canberra, Australia
May Guild	1937	bronze	71.46	National Gallery of Australia	Canberra, Australia
Bust of Frank McIlwraith	1937	patinated bronze	2009.48	National Portrait Gallery	Canberra, Australia
Stanley Bruce	1937	cast bronze	2000.15	National Portrait Gallery	Canberra, Australia
Field Marshal the Lord Birdwood	1938	patinated plaster	2009.47	National Portrait Gallery	Canberra, Australia
Hands	1938	drawing in pencil	89.1942	National Gallery of Australia	Canberra, Australia
Rear Gunner RAAF (Warrant Officer Norman Williams)	1943	plaster	220.2015	Art Gallery of New South Wales	Sydney, Australia
Squadron Leader R. H. Gibbes	1943	plaster	219.2015	Art Gallery of New South Wales	Sydney, Australia
Figure	1950	mountain ash	222.2015	Art Gallery of New South Wales	Sydney, Australia
Torso	1954	sandstone on wooden base	2008.673.A	National Gallery of Australia	Canberra, Australia
Dr Lloyd Rees	1966	bronze	257.1981	Art Gallery of New South Wales	Sydney, Australia
Dr Lloyd Rees	1966	teracotta	68.40	National Gallery of Australia	Canberra, Australia
Dang, Child of Thailand	1971	bronze	DONMG 1991.1022	Doncaster Museum and Art Gallery	Yorkshire, England
Dr Joan M Redshaw AM	1982	terracotta	2016.21	National Portrait Gallery	Canberra, Australia
Kookaburra	1987	bronze	BRSRW.0857	Royal West of England Academy	Bristol, England
Zamenof	-	terracotta	-	Potteries Museum & Art Gallery	Stoke-on-Trent, England

== Legacy ==
Tribe specified in her will that some of her works were to be sold in aid of setting up the Barbara Tribe Foundation. Administered by the Art Gallery of New South Wales, the aim of the foundation is to promote sculpture in Australia.

An archive relating to Barbara Tribe is held by the National Art Archive at the Art Gallery of New South Wales and MS 46 Papers of Barbara Tribe is her archive held by the National Gallery of Australia Research Library and Archives. The archive is mainly photo albums of her work captioned by Tribe, ranging from early student days in 1928 to the 1980s.
