= National Gallery of Australia Research Library and Archives =

Art gallery library

Coordinates: 35°18′01″S 149°08′12″E

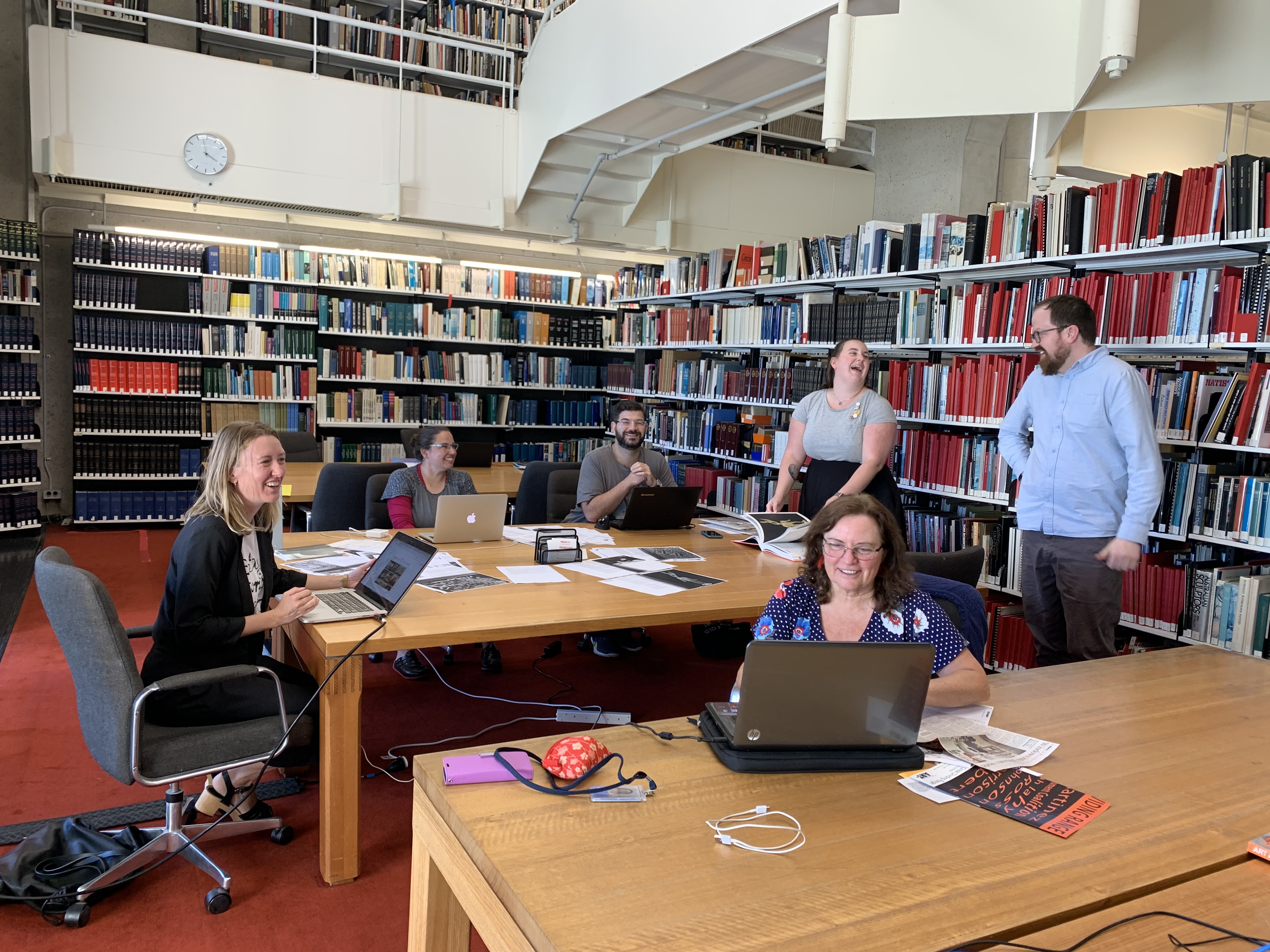
Participants in a March 2021 Wikipedia 'edit-a-thon' at the National Gallery of Australia Research Library

The National Gallery of Australia Research Library and Archives is the pre-eminent art library in Australia, located in Canberra.

== History ==
In 1975 and 1976 Kay Vernon held the title of Librarian of the Australian National Gallery. The Chief Librarian, Margaret Shaw, was appointed in 1978 about 3 years before the Gallery opened and retired in 2004.

== Services ==
The Research Library has a Reference Service that is available to the public online via the National Gallery website. Since 2020 the Research Library has partnered with Wikimedia Australia to host and support Know My Name edit-a-thons to increase understanding and appreciation of work by Australian women artists.

== Collections ==
The Research Library holdings provide a general coverage of art history with particular strengths supporting the Gallery's art collection, these include:

- Aboriginal art
- Asian textiles
- Australian art
- Ballets Russes
- Contemporary art worldwide
- Selected areas of African, Oceanic and Pre-Columbian art

Collection holdings are listed on the national database Libraries Australia or directly, via the Research Library catalogue.

=== Special collections ===
The Research Library has a number of special collections of rare or fragile materials, including:

- Contemporary auction sale catalogues;
- Contemporary Exhibition catalogues;
- Crystal Palace Exhibition materials;
- Nineteenth Century Auction Sales;
- Nineteenth Century Decorative Arts;
- Nineteenth Century Periodicals;
- Nineteenth Century Photography;
- Paris Salon catalogues;

Supporting this last collection of Paris Salon catalogues, the Research Library has developed an extensive finding aid and research resource to assist researchers.

=== Ephemera collection and artists’ files ===
The Ephemera collection consists of more than 100,000 files, with over 1 million items, containing information on the National Gallery of Australia, Australian art schools and galleries, and on Australian and International artists, museums, collectors and curators.

This is also known as the Documentation Collection, and each individual file can contain press clippings, exhibition flyers, catalogues, receipt books, or price lists preserved in mylar packets and acid-free archival boxes. These materials can be used to establish art chronologies and values.

=== Archives and manuscripts ===
The Research Library's Archive and Manuscript collection contains personal papers and records Australian visual art history. Notable holdings include the papers of Maximilian Feuerring, the Grieve Family, Fred Williams, Richard Boulez, Frances Burke, Frances Derham, Marcella Hempel, Helene Kirsova, Bernard Hall, Jan Dunn, Paul Taylor, Pat Gilmour, Jasia Reichardt, Barbara Tribe and Neil Roberts; and records of the Print Council of Australia, Gallery A, Art Galleries Association of Australia, Art Museums Association of Australia, Arts Libraries Society/Australia and New Zealand, Sir William Dobell Art Foundation.

=== Audio visual materials ===
The Research Library Audio Visual collection includes published and unpublished documentary audio and video recordings relating to many National Gallery events and interviews with artists. Notable amongst the collection are 98 interviews by the artist James Gleeson conducted in the late 1970s called the James Gleeson Oral History Collection, which has been inscribed into the UNESCO Australian Memory of the World Register 2008 as being of significant Australian cultural heritage.
