= Jan Dunn (ceramicist) =

Australian ceramicist, potter and teacher (1940–2002)

Jan Dunn (23 May 1940 – 15 May 2002) born in Springvale, Victoria, Australia, was a potter, ceramicist and teacher.

== Ceramics biography ==
=== Art education ===
Dunn graduated from the former Canberra School of Art in 1979 with a Diploma of Visual Arts – Ceramics, travelled to Egypt and the Middle East where she studied Arab lustreware in 1978 and 1987 and lived in Tokyo for three years (1985 –1988) studying Japanese pottery and brushwork.

=== Ceramics career ===
Jan Dunn worked from her home studio in Canberra, Australian Capital Territory (ACT), Australia. She held positions on national ceramics committees and the ACT Crafts Council and taught pottery at the Australian National University (ANU) Arts Centre and Workshop, in schools, colleges and in her own studio. Her ceramics are held in the Canberra Museum and Gallery, Central Craft in Alice Springs and the National Gallery of Australia where her art diaries and papers are also in the gallery's archives. Slides of Dunn's work were accepted into the Craft Australia (then the Crafts Council of Australia) slide library. From the 1960s to the early 1990s, Craft Australia maintained a slide library of original artwork from the Australian Studio Craft Movement representing the work of professional craftspeople.

Dunn maintained a network of colleagues and continued to learn from them; Australian potters and ceramicists such as Marea Gazzard, Rod Bamford, Janet deBoos, Anita McIntyre, Alan Peascod, and international speakers at the National Ceramics Conferences in the 1980s such as Colin Pearson, Michael Cardew and Paul Soldner. She contributed to the development of Australian ceramics through her committee work which included the National Ceramic Award Committee 1990 to 1994, National Ceramic Conference Committee 1996, Management Committee ACT Crafts Council 1988 to 90 and ACT Crafts Council fundraising Committee 1992.

=== Technique ===
During the 1980s Dunn produced lustreware vases, pots and occasionally platters, often decorated with traditional motifs. She built two kilns in her home studio in Canberra, Australian Capital Territory with some kiln parts bought from her time in Japan. She made hundreds of sketches in her sketchbooks of flowers, seed pods, jugs, vases, symbols from various countries and preliminary designs for her own pottery. An art historian and curator described her vessels: "Dunn's irregular vessels draw their inspiration from shapes found in traditional Islamic objects and architecture and from the vessels and decoration of Medieval Europe. They also show the influence of time spent in Japan (1985-1988), a place where the traditional art of Tea expresses the importance of imperfection." Artfile featured a photo of one of her vessels from the Craft Australia slide library with a description of her combination and adaptation of traditional techniques, "Her one-of-a-kind decorative pieces have an Oriental flavour reflecting her interest in the Middle East and time spent in Japan".

In the 1990s her practice changed towards using dry glaze, making irregular vessels decorated with animals and plants. In 1991 her ceramic Persian poppies was exhibited by Central Craft in the Alice Craft Acquisition Award at the Araluen Arts Centre, Alice Springs, Northern Territory and subsequently acquired by Central Craft for its collection. She also began studies in life drawing as her health deteriorated. Dunn's last solo exhibition, Metamorphica, was at the Link Gallery, Canberra Theatre Centre in 2000 where she showed her later dry-glaze fantasy creatures. In 2012 the Canberra Museum and Gallery acquired three Dunn vases created in the early 1980s from wheel-thrown stoneware, using a cobalt glaze under Arabian lustre glaze. The vases are decorated with Dunn's adaptations of traditional motifs and decoration.

=== Ceramics legacy ===
Dunn's papers, sketchbooks and four vases were accepted into the National Gallery of Australia's archives and collection in 2003.

=== Exhibitions, grants, awards ===
1979 Graduation exhibition, Canberra School of Art

1980 Emerging Craftsmen, Melbourne Vic exhibition and received Emerging Craftsman Grant

1981

- Canberra Potters Society Annual Exhibition, First Prize
- Arabian lustre pots at Potters Place Gallery
- Potters Gallery, Sydney NSW
- Manly Ceramics, Manly NSW

1982

- Studio tours and openings, Craft Council of the ACT
- Year of the Tree, Craft Council ACT, Canberra
- Blaxland Gallery, Myer, Sydney NSW
- Solo show at Potters Place, Kingston
- Craft Council Showcase, Canberra
- Women in art, Manly Art Gallery, Manly Sydney NSW

1983

- Crafts from the Capital, Darwin NT
- Ceramics 83, Manly Art Gallery, Manly NSW

1984

- Australian Craft Council, Sydney
- The Craft Centre Christmas Show, South Yarra

1987-88 Tokyo American Club exhibitions

1990 June, at the Crafts Council, Watson, ACT, Triple Treat ceramics

1991

- ACT Department of Education and the Arts Professional Development Grant
- Southerners, Craftsmans Collection, Brisbane
- David Jones Australia Day exhibition, Sydney
- Alice Springs Craft Acquisition, Alice Springs NT

1991, 1992, 1993 Australia Day Ceramic Award, Shepparton Art Gallery

1992 Artefact, Intercultural Harmony and Unity, Melbourne

1993

- Crossing Over, Crafts Council Gallery, ACT
- Teapots, Customs House Gallery, Warrnambool, Vic

1994

- In Rapport, The China Tea Club in North Lyneham
- Pieces of Importance, Crafts Council of the ACT
- Candlesticks, The Old bakery Gallery, Lane Cove

1995

- The Australian Craft Show, National Convention Centre
- Bed and Breakfast: Annual Members' Exhibition, Crafts Council of the ACT Gallery
- Canberra Contemporary Craft, Meat Market, Melbourne Vic

1996 Connections, ANCA Gallery, Canberra

1997

- Intercontinental Hotel, Ho Chi Minh City
- Turning Point, Craft ACT Gallery, Canberra

1998 Orientations, Ceramic Art Gallery, Sydney

1999 Cutaway, Craft ACT Gallery, Canberra

2000 Metamorphica, Link Gallery, Canberra Theatre Centre.

2001

- Bowled Over, Fremantle Art Gallery, Fremantle WA
- Timeless Interactions, ANCA Gallery, Canberra

2002 Trademarks: 2002 accredited professional members exhibition, Craft ACT
