= Morrab Library =

Library in Cornwall, England

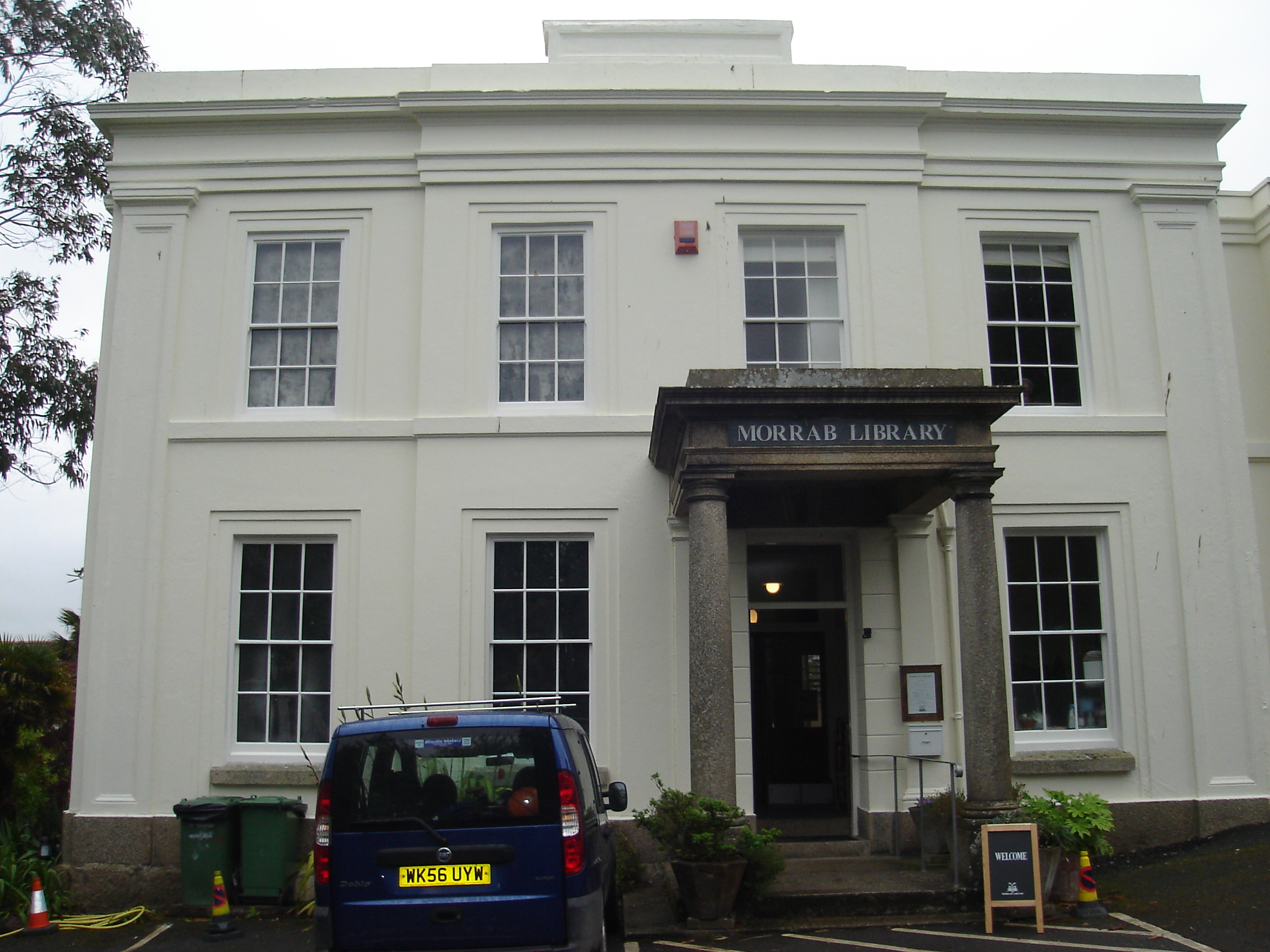
- Morrab library

- Location within Southwest Cornwall
- Former names: Penzance Library

General information
- Location: Penzance, Cornwall
- Coordinates: 50°6′57″N 5°32′13″W

Website
- www.morrablibrary.org.uk

The Morrab Library is a subscription library in Penzance, Cornwall in England.

The library, situated in Morrab House within Morrab Gardens, was founded in 1818 and is financed through membership subscriptions, legacies, grants, and a regular contribution from the Dennis G C Myner Charitable Trust.

== Collections ==
The Morrab Library holds over 60,000 books, and extensive archive collections. Notable collections include the Dawson Napoleonic Collection comprising over 3,000 engravings and prints, photographic collections of over 15,000 prints and negatives, extensive runs of 18th and 19th century journals, the Jenner Collection of Cornish and Celtic books, and over 2,000 books printed from the 16th to 18th centuries.

== History ==
The Morrab Library was originally known as the Penzance Library, and was officially formed at the beginning of 1818. It emerged out of the activities of two Penzance book clubs, one each for ladies and gentlemen. The Ladies Book Club was the earliest, created in 1770 (possibly making it the only one of its kind outside London at the time), and lending books to its members for four days at a time. The Gentleman's Book Club followed in 1779. The first president was Sir Rose Price Bart of Trengwainton and by 1820 the library had over one hundred members.

The Library was first located in an apartment at Cummins's Hotel in Penzance's Market Place, before moving, in 1818, to Geological House at 10 North Parade where it shared premises with the Royal Geological Society of Cornwall and the Agricultural Society. During 1867 the Library moved to the new Public Buildings (now known as St John's Hall) in Alverton Street.

The Morrab Library is housed within Morrab House in the Morrab Gardens, which was built in 1841 for the brewer Samuel Pidwell. The house is described as "...a large stucco villa in the Georgian manner with columned porch" and is a grade II listed building. Shortly after the Pidwell family moved to Portugal, it became the home of Charles Campbell Ross, Member of Parliament for the St Ives constituency from 1881–1885. On 16 July 1888 the house and walled gardens were bought by the Corporation of Penzance for £3,120 for use as a municipal park. The gardens opened on 27 September 1889 with a half day holiday and a procession through the streets. The library moved into Morrab House in the same year.

The Morrab Library is a member of the Independent Libraries Association, which was founded in 1989.

== Past presidents ==
- Sir Rose Price, Bart., 13 May 1818 – 1824
- Lt-gen Watkins Tench, 6 September 1824 – 1828 (may have been nominal president until his death at Devonport, 7 May 1833)
- Joseph Carne, 13 January 1834–12 October 1858
- J J A Boase, 10 January 1859–end of 1873
- William Bolitho, junior, January 1874–

== Past librarians ==
- Dr John Forbes, 1818–1822
- Rev John Foxell, 1822–1852
- James Flamank, 1852–1862
- Leonard Richard Willan, MD, 14 May 1862 – 22 May 1882
- Rev Prebendary Hedgeland 13 June 1882–
