= Godfrey Pilkington =

British art dealer (1918–2007)

- Born: Richard Godfrey Pilkington; 8 November 1918; Fairfield nr. Crank, Merseyside,
- Died: 8 July 2007 (aged 88)
- Education: Trinity College, Cambridge
- Occupation: Art Dealer
- Known for: Directing the Piccadilly Gallery; Work in arts in St Helens
- Spouse: Eve Pilkington (Maiden: Vincent)

Godfrey Pilkington (8 November 1918 – 8 July 2007) was a British art dealer, director and co-founder of the Piccadilly Gallery.

Pilkington is remembered for his work at the Piccadilly Gallery and in the community of St. Helen's from where his family operated Pilkington Glass from 1826 to 2006. Together with his wife Eve and Christabel Briggs, Pilkington enjoyed over half a century of trade with the Piccadilly, avoiding the prevailing commercialism and the fashion for abstract art. He championed the works of neglected figurative artists, Art Nouveau and 19th- and 20th-century Symbolism.

In December 2006 the Rainford Gallery in St Helens, Merseyside was renamed the Godfrey Pilkington art gallery after the gallerist.

Pilkington and his wife closed the Piccadilly Gallery on Dover Street on 31 May 2007.
