= Piccadilly Gallery =

Former art gallery in London

The Piccadilly Gallery was a London-based art gallery that operated from 1953 until 2007.

The gallery was founded in 1953 as the Pilkington Gallery by art dealer Godfrey Pilkington and his wife, Eve. Christabel Briggs joined as a partner in 1956. The gallery first opened in a bomb-damaged section of the Piccadilly Arcade. In 1954, the gallery moved to 16A Cork Street, moving again in 1978 one address over. In 1999, the gallery moved to a temporary location on Dover street. The gallery ceased operations in March 2007, just prior to the death of co-founder Godfrey Pilkington four months later, at the age of 88.

The Piccadilly Gallery focused on exhibiting and selling works by figurative artists, with a focus on Art Nouveau and 19th and 20th Century Symbolism. The gallery promoted artists such as Adrian Berg, Max Beerbohm, Gwen John, Eric Gill, Colin Self, and William Roberts (many of whom were members of the British Brotherhood of Ruralists). The gallery also hosted major exhibitions including works by Gustav Klimt, Egon Schiele, and artists involved in the German art movement New Objectivity.

Listings of the gallery's exhibitions and correspondences were held by the Tate Modern Gallery.

== Citation ==
Foot, Tom (24 August 2007), "Godfrey Pilkington – Gentlemanly art dealer and director of the Piccadilly Gallery", The West End Extra

51.5082°N 0.1421°W
