= Morrab Gardens =

Municipal park in Penzance, United Kingdom

Coordinates: 50.116°N 5.537°W

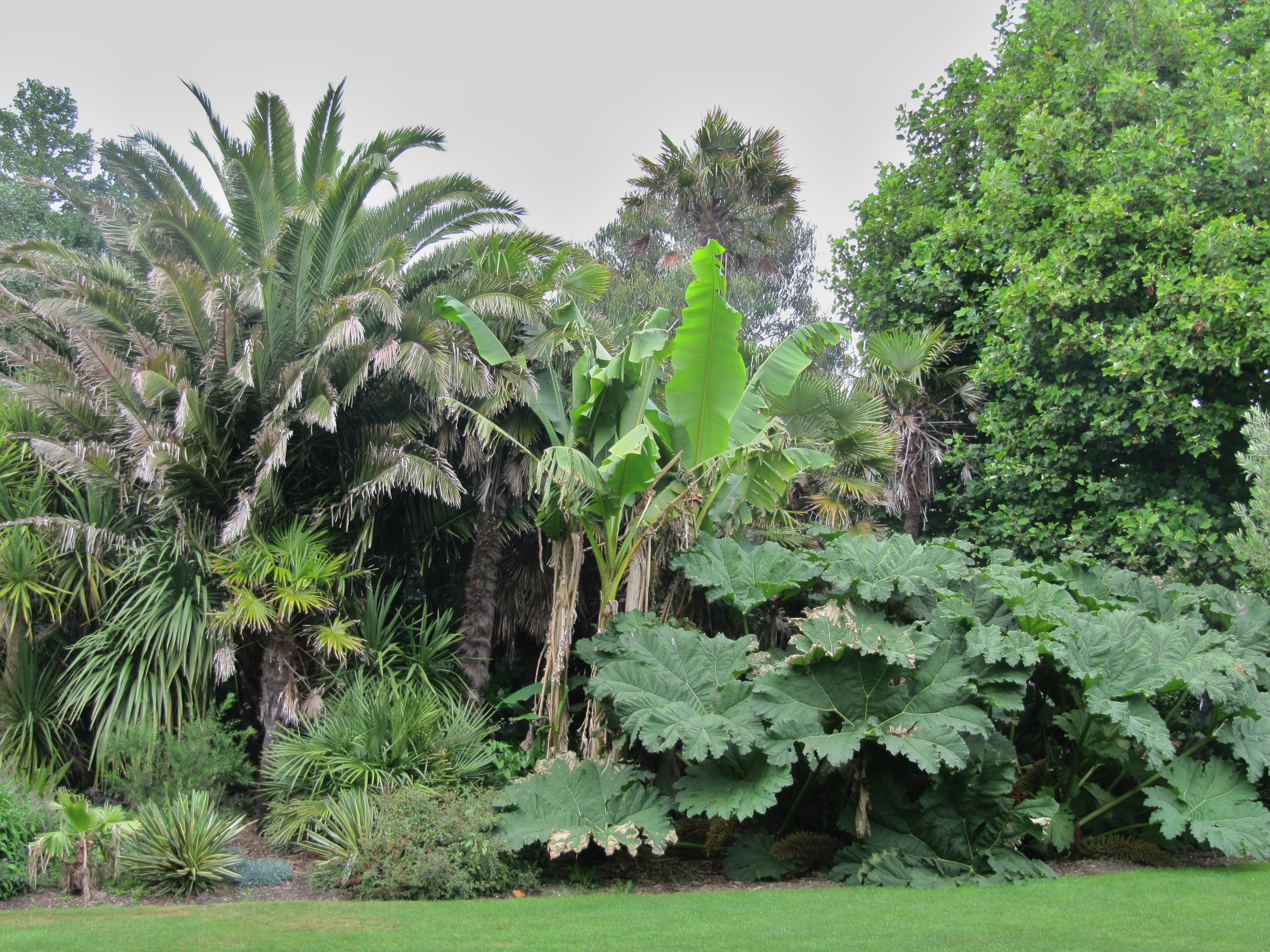
- Interactive map of Morrab Gardens
- Location: Penzance, Cornwall
- Area: 1.2 ha (3.0 acres)
- Created: 1889
- Operator: Cornwall Council
- Status: Open daylight hours all year

Morrab Gardens (Cornish: Lowarth Morrep) are a municipal garden covering 1.2 ha (3.0 acres) to the south of Penzance town centre, Cornwall. It is known for its Mediterranean and sub-tropical plants; and for housing the Morrab Library in the grounds.

Morrab House with its walled garden was built in 1841 for brewer Samuel Pidwell. The house is described as "...a large stucco villa in the Georgian manner with columned porch". Shortly after the Pidwell family moved to Portugal the property was purchased by Charles Campbell Ross, a banker and Member of Parliament for the St Ives Constituency. In September 1881, Ross advertised Morrab House for rent. There was also a cottage suitable for a coachman or gardener, stables for three horses, a conservatory with hot water apparatus, a dairy, coach-house, fruit and flower gardens, lawn and meadow land. Morrab House was auctioned on 29 August 1887 and was purchased for £2,800 by Mr King, who was Her Majesty's Inspector of Schools for the district. At that time a tenant was paying £115 rent for the house and 2.75 acres (1.11 ha) of gardens and meadow.

On 16 July 1888 the house and walled gardens were bought by the Corporation of Penzance for £3,120 and tenders for the design of the garden were advertised nationally. The winning prize was £21, with ten guineas for second place plus two other prizes. Entrants came from all over the country with ten plans exhibited and four winners chosen. Reginald Upcher, a landscape gardener of Portland Place, London was commissioned, to develop the grassy fields sloping down to the sea into a municipal park. Robert Veitch of Exeter came second. The original design is held in the County Record Office, Truro and the garden follows faithfully Upcher's plan. The gardens opened on 27 September 1889 with a half day holiday and a procession through the streets.

In the same year the Penzance Library (now known as the Morrab Library) secured a lease as tenants and moved to Morrab House from the municipal buildings. The garden is now in the ownership of Cornwall Council and features some Grade II Listed Buildings including a Victorian bandstand, fountain and Boer war memorial.
