= Penzance School of Art =

Art school in Penzance, England

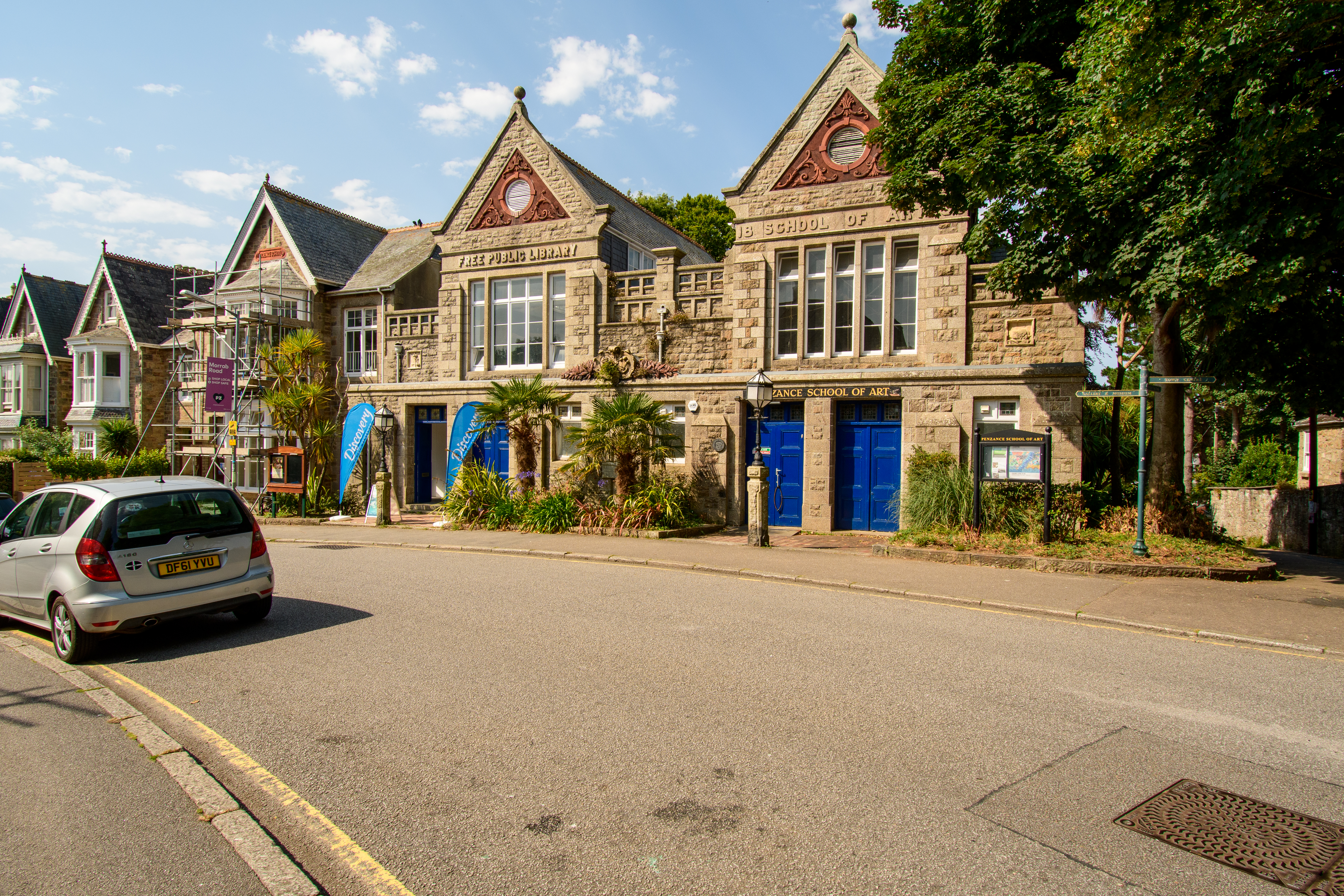

- Location within Cornwall
- 50.117169°N 5.539817°W
- Location: Morrab Road, Penzance, Cornwall, England

History
- Built: 1881

Site notes
- Architect: Silvanus Trevail

Listed Building – Grade II
- Official name: Penzance School of Art and Library
- Designated: 5 September 2017
- Reference no.: 1447144

Penzance School of Art is an art school in Penzance, Cornwall, England, housed in a purpose-built Grade II listed building opened in 1881.

== History and description ==
The building, designed by Silvanus Trevail, was erected in 1880–81 and opened on 7 March 1881. It was the first permanent home of the Penzance School of Art, founded in 1853 by Henry Geoffroi. The building was financed by the gift of land and other donations.

During the late 1880s there was remodelling of the façade, and a museum and science school were added, all designed by Henry White FRIBA, a former student. The building is constructed of dressed granite, with roofs of Cornish slate. The front of the building facing Morrab Street is in English Revival style.

In its early years, exhibitions were held at the museum of works by artists of the Newlyn School, such as Stanhope Forbes and Walter Langley. After the Newlyn Art Gallery was constructed in 1894, the museum was less often used as a venue for exhibitions, and it became a library, run by the Borough Council.

Visiting lecturers have included Lamorna Birch, Barbara Hepworth and Graham Sutherland; a pottery school was established by Bernard Leach. Past students include Peter Lanyon, Robin Welch, Jack Pender and Jonathon Coudrille. The Australian sculptor, Barbara Tribe taught there for 40 years until 1988.

The school was run from 1984 by Cornwall County Council, and since 1989 by Penwith College; the library closed in 2016.
