= Roseveare =

Roseveare is a British surname of Cornish origin. Notable people with the surname include:

- Bob Roseveare (1923–2004), English codebreaker at Bletchley Park during World War II
- Helen Roseveare (1925–2016), English Christian missionary, doctor and author
- Ione Roseveare (1921–2010), English Bletchley Park staff
- Martin Roseveare (1898-1985), English mathematician
- Richard Roseveare (1902–1972), English Anglican bishop in Africa

== See also ==
- Rosevear (surname)
