= Cornish people =

Ethnic group in Cornwall, England, UK, and the worldwide Cornish diaspora

Cornish people Kernowyon
- Flag of Cornwall

Total population
- Population of Cornwall from 2021 UK Census 532,300; 99,754 stating their national identity as Cornish or Cornish and British in the United Kingdom Census 2021 in England and Wales (in Cornwall, 15.6% of the population); 26% of the population of Cornwall identified as Cornish in the Cornwall Quality of Life Survey 2007; 32,254 – 46% of school pupils in Cornwall recorded as having Cornish ethnicity in 2013, rising to 51.1% in 2017; 37,500 identifying their ethnicity as Cornish in the United Kingdom Census 2001; 1,975 identifying as having Cornish ethnic origins in the Canada 2016 Census

Regions with significant populations
- United Kingdom (England and Wales) 99,754 (2021) (Scotland) 467 (2011)

Significant Cornish diaspora in
- United States: 1,000,000 – 2,500,000
- Australia: 1,000,000
- Canada: 1,975
- Mexico
- New Zealand
- South Africa

Languages
- English (Anglo-Cornish and West Country dialects) · Cornish · British Sign

Religion
- Mainly Christianity

Related ethnic groups
- Bretons, English people, Irish people, Manx people, Scottish people, Welsh people

Cornish people or the Cornish (Cornish: Kernowyon, Old English: Cornƿīelisċ) are a Celtic ethnic group native to Cornwall and a recognised national minority in the United Kingdom. Like the Welsh and Bretons, it can trace its roots to the ancient Britons who inhabited Great Britain from somewhere between the 11th and 7th centuries BC and inhabited Britain at the time of the Roman conquest. Many in Cornwall today continue to assert a distinct identity separate from or in addition to English or British identities. Cornish identity has also been adopted by some migrants into Cornwall, as well as by emigrant and descendant communities from Cornwall, the latter sometimes referred to as the Cornish diaspora. Although not included as a tick-box option in the UK census, the numbers of those writing in a Cornish ethnic and national identity are officially recognised and recorded.

Throughout classical antiquity, the ancient Celtic Britons formed a series of tribes, kingdoms, cultures and identities throughout Great Britain; the Dumnonii and Cornovii were the Celtic tribes who inhabited what was to become Cornwall during the Iron Age, Roman and post-Roman periods. The name Cornwall and its demonym Cornish are derived from the Celtic Cornovii tribe. The Anglo-Saxon invasion and settlement of Britain starting from the late 5th and early 6th centuries and the arrival of Scots from Ireland during the same period gradually restricted the Romano-British culture and Brittonic language into parts of the north and west of Great Britain by the 10th century, whilst the inhabitants of southern, central and eastern Britain became English and much of the north became Scottish. The Cornish people, who shared the Brythonic language with the Welsh, Cumbrics and Picts, and also the Bretons who had migrated across the sea to escape the Anglo-Saxon invasions, were referred to in the Old English language as the "Westwalas" meaning West Welsh. The Battle of Deorham between the Britons and Anglo-Saxons is thought to have resulted in a loss of land links with the people of Wales.

The Cornish people and their Brythonic Cornish language experienced a slow process of anglicisation and attrition during the medieval and early modern periods. By the 18th century, and following the creation of the Kingdom of Great Britain, the Cornish language and to some degree identity had faded, largely replaced by the English language (albeit Cornish-influenced West Country dialects and Anglo-Cornish) or British identity. A Celtic revival during the early-20th century enabled a cultural self-consciousness in Cornwall that revitalised the Cornish language and roused the Cornish to express a distinctly Brittonic Celtic heritage. The Cornish language was granted official recognition under the European Charter for Regional or Minority Languages in 2002, and in 2014 the Cornish people were recognised and afforded protection by the UK Government under the Framework Convention for the Protection of National Minorities.

In the 2021 census, the population of Cornwall, including the Isles of Scilly, was recorded as 570,300. The Cornish self-government movement has called for greater recognition of Cornish culture, politics, and language, and urged that Cornish people be accorded greater status, exemplified by the call for them to be one of the listed ethnic groups in the United Kingdom Census 2011 form.

== Classification ==
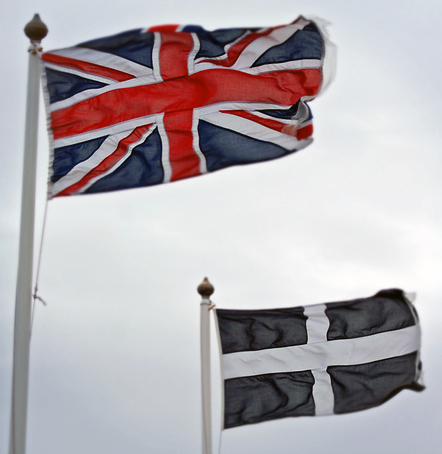
The Union and Cornish flags.

Both geographic and historical factors distinguish the Cornish as an ethnic group further supported by identifiable genetic variance between the populations of Cornwall, neighbouring Devon and England as published in a 2012 Oxford University study. Throughout medieval and Early Modern Britain, the Cornish were at some points accorded the same status as the English and Welsh and considered a separate race or nation, distinct from their neighbours, with their own language, society and customs. A process of Anglicisation between 1485 and 1700 led to the Cornish adopting English language, culture and civic identity, a view reinforced by Cornish historian A. L. Rowse who said they were gradually "absorbed into the mainstream of English life". Although "decidedly modern" and "largely retrospective" in its identity politics, Cornish and Celtic associations have advanced the notion of a distinct Cornish national and ethnic identity since the late 20th century. In the United Kingdom Census 2001, despite no explicit "Cornish" option being available, approximately 34,000 people in Cornwall and 3,500 people elsewhere in the UK—a combined total equal to nearly 7 per cent of the population of Cornwall—identified themselves as ethnic Cornish by writing this in under the "other" ethnicity option. The census figures show a change in identity from West to East, in Penwith 9.2 per cent identified as ethnically Cornish, in Kerrier it was 7.5 per cent, in Carrick 6.6 per cent, Restormel 6.3 per cent, North Cornwall 6 per cent, and Caradon 5.6 per cent. Weighting of the 2001 Census data gives a figure of 154,791 people with Cornish ethnicity living in Cornwall.

The Cornish have been described as "a special case" in England, with an "ethnic rather than regional identity". Structural changes to the politics of the United Kingdom, particularly the European Union and devolution, have been cited as the main stimulus to "a growing interest in Cornish identity and distinctiveness" in late-20th century Britain. The British are the citizens of the United Kingdom, a people who by convention consist of four national groups: the English, Northern Irish, Scots and Welsh. In the 1990s it was said that the notion that the Cornish are to be classified as a nation comparable to the English, Irish, Scots and Welsh, "has practically vanished from the popular consciousness" outside Cornwall, and that, despite a "real and substantive" identity, the Cornish "struggle for recognition as a national group distinct from the English". However, in 2014, after a 15-year campaign, the UK government officially recognised the Cornish as a national minority under the Council of Europe's Framework Convention for the Protection of National Minorities, giving the Cornish the same status as the Welsh, Scots and Irish within the UK.

Inhabitants of Cornwall may have multiple political allegiances, adopting mixed, dual or hyphenated identities such as "Cornish first and British second", "Cornish and British and European", or, like Phil Vickery (a rugby union prop for the England national rugby union team and British and Irish Lions), describe themselves as "Cornish" and "English". Meanwhile, another international rugby union player, Josh Matavesi, describes himself as Cornish-Fijian and Cornish not English.

A survey by Plymouth University in 2000 found that 30% of children in Cornwall felt "Cornish, not English". A 2004 survey on national identity by the finance firm Morgan Stanley found that 44% of respondents in Cornwall saw themselves as Cornish rather than British or English. A 2008 University of Exeter study conducted in 16 towns across Cornwall found that 59% felt themselves to be Cornish and 41% felt "More Cornish than English", while for over a third of respondents the Cornish identity formed their primary national identity. Genealogy and family history were considered to be the chief criteria for 'being' Cornish, particularly among those who possessed such ties, while being born in Cornwall was also held to be important.

A 2008 study by the University of Edinburgh of 15- and 16-year-old schoolchildren in Cornwall found that 58% of respondents felt themselves to be either 'Fairly' or 'Very much' Cornish. The other 42% may be the result of in-migration to the area during the second half of the twentieth century.

A 2010 study by the University of Exeter into the meaning of contemporary Cornish identity across Cornwall found that there was a "west-east distance decay in the strength of the Cornish identity." The study was conducted amongst the farming community as they were deemed to be the socio-professional group most objectively representative of Cornishness. All participants categorised themselves as Cornish and identified Cornish as their primary ethnic group orientation. Those in the west primarily thought of themselves as Cornish and British/Celtic, while those in the east tended to think of themselves as Cornish and English. All participants in West Cornwall who identified as Cornish and not English described people in East Cornwall, without hesitation, as equally Cornish as themselves. Those who identified as Cornish and English stressed the primacy of their Cornishness and a capacity to distance themselves from their Englishness. Ancestry was seen as the most important criterion for being categorised as Cornish, above place of birth or growing up in Cornwall. This study supports a 1988 study by Mary McArthur that had found that the meanings of Cornishness varied substantially, from local to national identity. Both studies also observed that the Cornish were less materialistic than the English. The Cornish generally saw the English, or city people, as being "less friendly and more aggressively self-promoting and insensitive". The Cornish saw themselves as friendly, welcoming and caring.

In November 2010 British prime minister, David Cameron, said "I think Cornish national identity is very powerful" and that his government would "devolve a lot of power to Cornwall – that will go to the Cornish unitary authority."

=== 2011 and 2021 UK Census ===
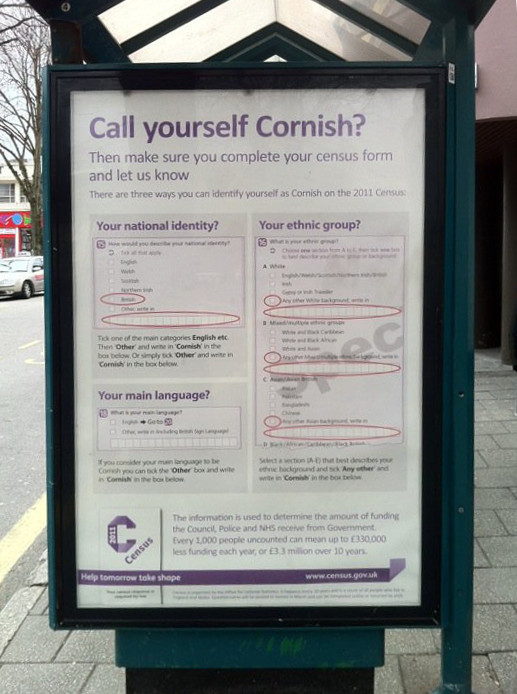
A poster in Cornwall telling people how to describe their ethnicity and national identity as Cornish in the 2011 census

A campaign for the inclusion of a Cornish tick-box in the nationality section of the 2011 census failed to win the support of Parliament in 2009. As a consequence, posters were created by the census organisation and Cornwall Council which advised residents how they could identify themselves as Cornish by writing it in the national identity and ethnicity sections and record Cornish in the main language section. Additionally, people could record Cornwall as their country of birth.

Like other identities, Cornish has an allocated census code, (06), the same as for 2001, which applied and was counted throughout Britain. People were first able to record their ethnicity as Cornish in the 2001 UK Census, and some 37,000 people did so by writing it in.

A total of 83,499 people in England and Wales were described as having a Cornish national identity. 59,456 of these were described as Cornish only, 6,261 as Cornish and British, and 17,782 as Cornish and at least one other identity, with or without British. Within Cornwall the total was 73,220 (14% of the population) with 52,793 (9.9%) as Cornish only, 5,185 (1%) as Cornish and British, and 15,242 (2.9%) as Cornish and at least one other identity, with or without British.

In Scotland 467 people described themselves as having Cornish national identity. 254 with Cornish identity only, 39 as Scottish and Cornish, and 174 having Cornish identity and at least one other UK identity (excluding Scottish).

In the 2021 census, 89,084 people in England and Wales described their national identity as Cornish only and 10,670 as Cornish and British. Within Cornwall, 79,938 people (14.0% of the population) specified a Cornish only identity and 9,146 (1.6%) Cornish in combination with British.

=== Schools census (PLASC) ===
Since 2006 school children in Cornwall have been able to record themselves as ethnically Cornish on the annual Schools Census (PLASC). Since then the number identifying as Cornish has risen from 24% to 51% in 2017. The Department for Education recommends that parents and guardians determine the ethnicity of children at primary schools whilst pupils at secondary schools can decide their own ethnicity.

- 2006: 23.7 percent – 17,218 pupils out of 72,571
- 2007: 27.3 percent – 19,988 pupils out of 72,842
- 2008: 30.3 percent – 21,610 pupils out of 71,302
- 2009: 33.9 percent – 23,808 pupils out of 70,275
- 2010: 37.2 percent – 26,140 pupils out of 69,950
- 2011: 40.9 percent – 28,584 pupils out of 69,811
- 2012: 43.0 percent – 30,181 pupils out of 69,909
- 2013: 46.0 percent – 32,254 pupils out of 70,097
- 2014: 48.0 percent
- 2017: 51.1 percent
- 2020: 45.9 percent - due to an error in the management system of a number of schools, pupils identifying as White Cornish were inadvertently changed to Any Other White resulting in a reduced figure for the year 2020.

== History ==
=== Ancestral roots ===
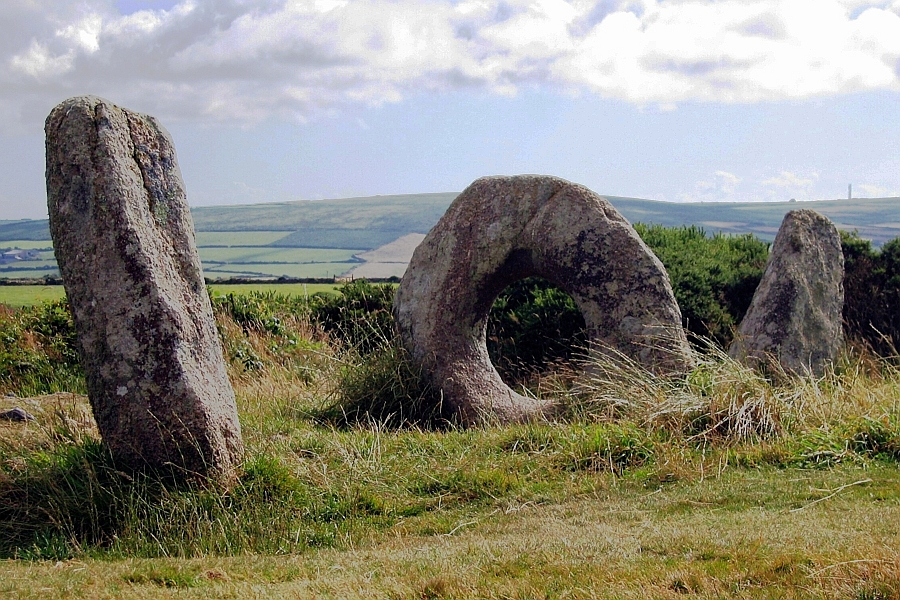
Mên-an-Tol is an ancient lith site in Cornwall

Traditionally, the Cornish are thought to have been descended from the Iron Age Celts, making them distinct from the English, many (but not all) of whom are descended from the Anglo-Saxons who colonised Great Britain from their homelands in northern Europe and drove the Celts to Britain's western and northern fringes. Recent genetic studies based on ancient DNA have complicated this picture, however. During the Bronze Age, most of the people that had inhabited Britain since the Neolithic era were replaced by Beaker People, while scholars have argued that the introduction of the Celtic languages and material culture into Britain and Ireland was by means of cultural diffusion, rather than any substantial migration. Genetic evidence has also suggested that while ancestry inherited from the Anglo-Saxons makes up a significant part of the modern English gene pool (one study suggested an average 38% contribution in eastern England), they did not displace all of the previous inhabitants. A 2015 study found that modern Cornish populations had less Anglo-Saxon ancestry than people from central and southern England, and that they were genetically distinct from their neighbors in Devon. The study also suggested that populations traditionally labelled as "Celtic" showed significant diversity, rather than a unified genetic identity.

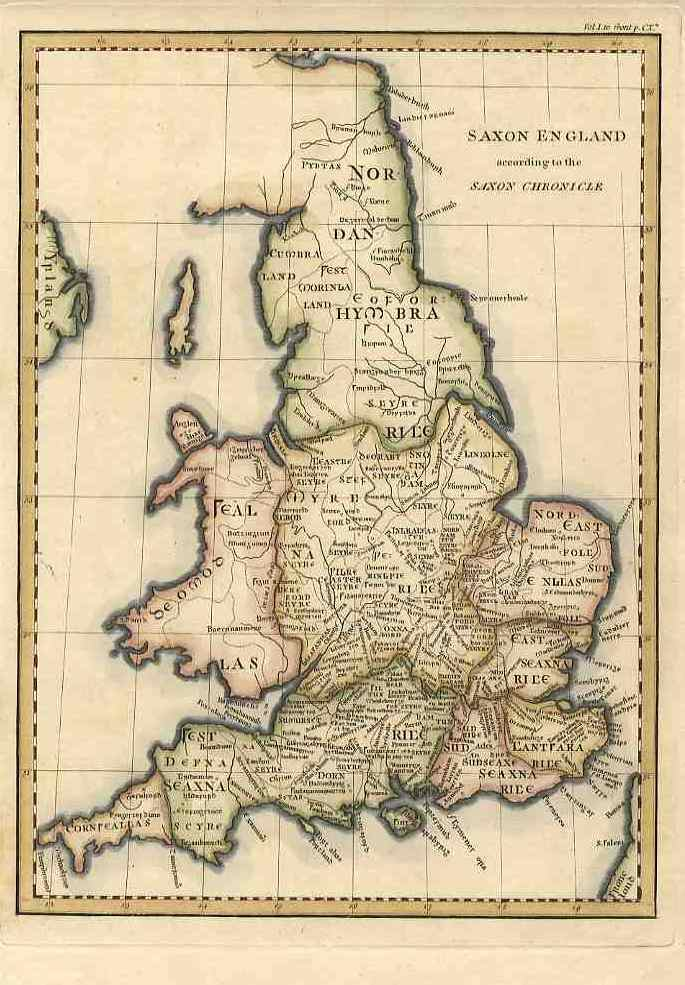
An 18th century map of Great Britain based on accounts from the Anglo-Saxon Chronicle, showing "Cornweallas"

Throughout classical antiquity the Celts spoke Celtic languages, and formed a series of tribes, cultures and identities, notably the Picts and Gaels in the north and the Britons in the south. The Britons were themselves a divided people; although they shared the Brythonic languages, they were tribal, and divided into regional societies, and within them sub-groups. Examples of these tribal societies were the Brigantes in the north, and the Ordovices, the Demetae, the Silures and the Deceangli in the west. In the extreme southwest, what was to become Cornwall, were the Dumnonii and Cornovii, who lived in the Kingdom of Dumnonia. The Roman conquest of Britain in the 1st century introduced Romans to Britain, who upon their arrival initially recorded the Dumnonii, but later reported on the Cornovii, who were possibly a sub-group of the Dumnonii. Although the Romans colonised much of central and southern Britain, Dumnonia was "virtually unaffected" by the conquest; Roman rule had little or no impact on the region, meaning it could flourish as a semi- or fully independent kingdom which evidence shows was sometimes under the dominion of the kings of the Britons, and sometimes to have been governed by its own Dumnonian monarchy, either by the title of duke or king. This petty kingdom shared strong linguistic, political and cultural links with Brittany, a peninsula on continental Europe south of Cornwall inhabited by Britons; the Cornish and Breton languages were nearly indistinguishable in this period, and both Cornwall and Brittany remain dotted with dedications to the same Celtic saints.

The Sack of Rome in the year 410 prompted a complete Roman departure from Britain, and Cornwall then experienced an influx of Celtic Christian missionaries from Ireland who had a profound effect upon the early Cornish people, their culture, faith and architecture. The ensuing decline of the Roman Empire encouraged the Anglo-Saxon invasion of Britain. The Angles, Jutes, Frisii and Saxons, Germanic peoples from northern Europe, established petty kingdoms and settled in different regions of what was to become England, and parts of southern Scotland, progressively defeating the Britons in battle. The Saxons of the Kingdom of Wessex in particular were expanding their territory westwards towards Cornwall. The Cornish were frequently embattled with the West Saxons, who used their Germanic word walha (modern English: Welsh) meaning "stranger" or "foreigner", to describe their opponents, later specifying them as the Westwalas (West Welsh) or Cornwalas (the Cornish). Conflict continued until King Athelstan of England determined that the River Tamar be the formal boundary between the West Saxons and the Cornish in the year 936, making Cornwall one of the last retreats of the Britons encouraging the development of a distinct Cornish identity; Brittonic culture in Britain became confined to Cornwall, parts of Devon, North West England, South West Scotland and Wales. Although a treaty was agreed, Anglo-Saxon political influence stretched westwards until some time in the late 10th century when "Cornwall was definitively incorporated into the Kingdom of England".

=== Anglicisation and rebellion ===
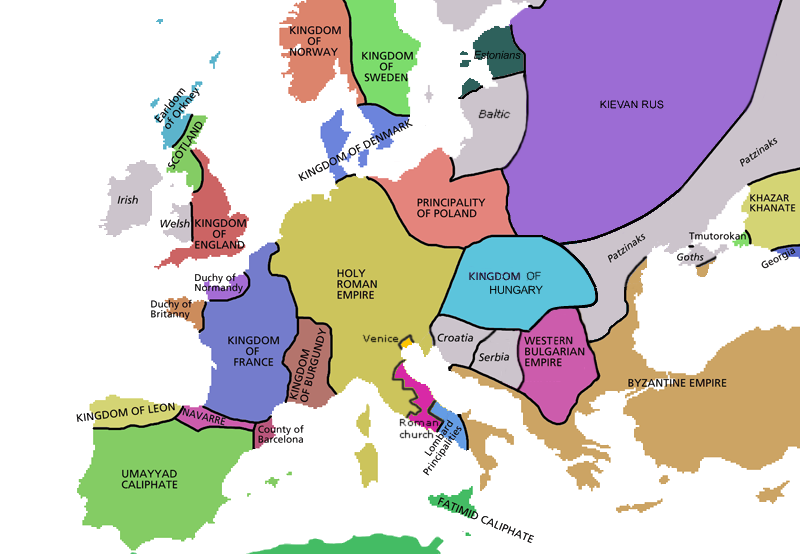
European nations in AD 998

The Norman Conquest of England, which began with an invasion by the troops of William, Duke of Normandy (later King William I) in 1066, resulted in the removal of the Anglo-Saxon derived monarchy, aristocracy, and clerical hierarchy and its replacement by Normans, Scandinavian Vikings from northern France and their Breton allies, who, in many cases, maintained rule in the Brittonic-speaking parts of the conquered lands. The shires of England were progressively divided amongst the companions of William I of England, who served as England's new nobility. The English would come to absorb the Normans, but the Cornish vigorously resisted their influence. At the time of the conquest, legend has it that Cornwall was under the governance of Condor, reported by later antiquarians to be the last Earl of Cornwall to be directly descended from the ancient monarchy of Cornwall. The Earldom of Cornwall had held devolved semi-sovereignty from England, but in 1067 was granted to Count Robert of Mortain, King William I's half-brother, and ruled thereafter by an Anglo-Norman aristocracy; in the Domesday Book, the record of the great survey of England completed in 1086, "virtually all" landowners in Cornwall "had English names, making it impossible to be sure who was Cornish and who was English by race". However, there was a persistent and "continuing differentiation" between the English and Cornish peoples during the Middle Ages, as evidenced by documents such as the 1173 charter of Truro which made explicit mention of both peoples as distinct.

The Earldom of Cornwall passed to various English nobles throughout the High Middle Ages, but in 1337 the earldom was given the status of a duchy, and Edward the Black Prince, the first son and heir of King Edward III, became the first Duke of Cornwall as a means for the prince to raise his own capital. Large parts of Cornwall were owned by Edward, 1st Duke of Cornwall, and successive English Dukes of Cornwall became the largest landowners in Cornwall; The monarchy of England established two special administrative institutions in Cornwall, the first being the Duchy of Cornwall (one of only two in the Kingdom of England) and the second being the Cornish Stannary Courts and Parliaments (which governed Cornwall's tin industry). These two institutions allowed "ordinary Cornish people to believe that they had been granted a unique constitutional status to reflect their unique cultural identity". However, the Duchy of Cornwall gradually lost its political autonomy from England, a state which became increasingly centralised in London, and by the early-Tudor period the Cornish had begun to see themselves as "a conquered people whose culture, liberties, and prosperity had been downgraded by the English". This view was exacerbated in the 1490s by heavy taxation imposed by King Henry VII of England upon the impoverished Cornish to raise funds for his military campaigns against King James IV of Scotland and Perkin Warbeck, as well as Henry VII's suspension of the privileges of the Cornish Stannaries. Having provided "more than their fair share of soldiers and sailors" for the conflict in northern England, and feeling aggrieved at "Cornwall's status as England's poorest county", a popular uprising out of Cornwall ensued—the Cornish rebellion of 1497. The rebellion was initially a political march from St Keverne to London led by Thomas Flamank and Michael An Gof, motivated by a "mixture of reasons"; to raise money for charity; to celebrate their community; to present their grievances to the Parliament of England, but gathered pace across the West Country as a revolt against the king.

The Cornish language experienced a shift between 1300 and 1750, with the Cornish people gradually adopting English as their common language.

Cornish was the most widely spoken language west of the River Tamar until around the mid-1300s, when Middle English began to be adopted as a common language of the Cornish people. As late as 1542 Andrew Boorde, an English traveller, physician and writer, wrote that in Cornwall there were two languages, "Cornysshe" and "Englysshe", but that "there may be many men and women" in Cornwall who could not understand English. While the Norman language was in use by much of the English aristocracy, Cornish was used as a lingua franca, particularly in the remote far west of Cornwall. Many Cornish landed gentry chose mottos in the Cornish language for their coat of arms, highlighting its socially high status. However, in 1549 and following the English Reformation, King Edward VI commanded that the Book of Common Prayer, an Anglican liturgical text in the English language, should be introduced to all churches in his kingdom, meaning that Latin and Celtic customs and services should be discontinued. The Prayer Book Rebellion was a militant revolt in Cornwall and parts of neighbouring Devon against the Act of Uniformity 1549, which outlawed all languages from church services apart from English, and is specified as a testament to the affection and loyalty the Cornish people held for the Cornish language. In the rebellion, separate risings occurred simultaneously in Bodmin in Cornwall, and Sampford Courtenay in Devon—which would both converge at Exeter, laying siege to the region's largest Protestant city. However, the rebellion was suppressed, thanks largely to the aid of foreign mercenaries in a series of battles in which "hundreds were killed", effectively ending Cornish as the common language of the Cornish people. The Anglicanism of the Reformation served as a vehicle for Anglicisation in Cornwall; Protestantism had a lasting cultural effect upon the Cornish by way of linking Cornwall more closely with England, while lessening political and linguistic ties with the Bretons of Brittany.

The English Civil War, a series of armed conflicts and political machinations between Parliamentarians and Royalists, polarised the populations of England and Wales. However, Cornwall in the English Civil War was a staunchly Royalist enclave, an "important focus of support for the Royalist cause". Cornish soldiers were used as scouts and spies during the war, for their language was not understood by English Parliamentarians. The peace that followed the close of the war led to a further shift to the English language by the Cornish people, which encouraged an influx of English people to Cornwall. By the mid-17th century the use of the Cornish language had retreated far enough west to prompt concern and investigation by antiquarians, such as William Scawen. As the Cornish language diminished the people of Cornwall underwent a process of English enculturation and assimilation, becoming "absorbed into the mainstream of English life".

=== Industry, revival and the modern period ===
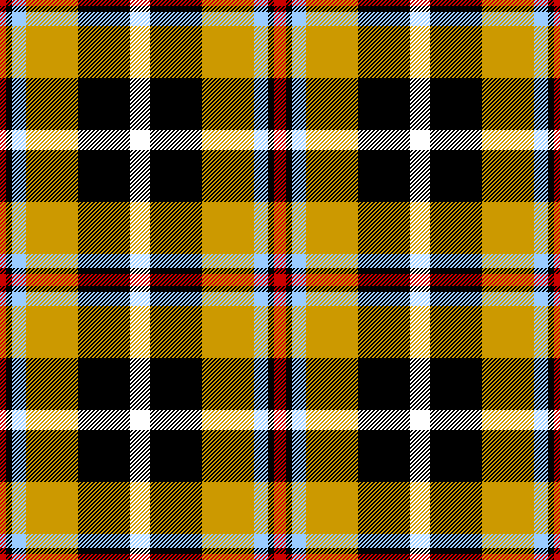
The National Tartan of Cornwall. Cornish kilts and tartans are emblematic of a resurgent, pan-Celtic Cornish identity developed during Cornwall's Celtic Revival.

The Industrial Revolution had a major impact upon the Cornish people. Cornwall's economy was fully integrated into England's, and mining in Cornwall, always an important source of employment and stability of the Cornish, experienced a process of industrialisation resulting in 30 per cent of Cornwall's adult population being employed by its mines. During this period, efforts were made by Cornish engineers to design steam engines with which to power water pumps for Cornish mines thus aiding the extraction of mineral ore. Industrial scale tin and copper mining operations in Cornwall melded Cornish identity with engines and heavy industry, and Cornwall's leading mining engineer, Richard Trevithick, became "as much a part of Cornwall's heritage as any legendary giant from its Celtic past". Trevithick's most significant success was a high-pressure steam engine used to pump water and refuse from mines, but he was also the builder of the first full-scale working railway steam locomotive. On 21 February 1804, the world's first locomotive-hauled railway journey took place as Trevithick's unnamed steam locomotive hauled a train along the tramway of the Penydarren ironworks, near Merthyr Tydfil in Wales.

The construction of the Great Western Railway during the Victorian era allowed for an influx of tourists to Cornwall from across Great Britain. Well into the Edwardian era and interwar period, Cornwall was branded as a rural retreat, a "primitive land of magic and romance", and as an "earlier incarnation of Englishness, a place more English than an England ravaged by modernity". Cornwall, the United Kingdom's only region with a subtropical-like climate, became a centre for English tourism, its coastline dominated by resort towns increasingly composed of bungalows and villas. John Nichols Thom, or Mad Tom, (1799 – 31 May 1838) was a Cornishman self-declared messiah who, in the 19th century led the last battle to be fought on English soil, known as the Battle of Bossenden Wood. While not akin to the Cornish rebellions of the past, he did attract some Cornish support as well as mostly Kentish labourers, although his support was primarily of religious followers.

In the latter half of the 19th century Cornwall experienced rapid deindustrialisation, with the closure of mines in particular considered by the Cornish to be both an economic and cultural disaster. This, coupled with the rise of Romantic nationalism in Europe inspired and influenced a Celtic Revival in Cornwall, a social, linguistic and artistic movement interested in Cornish medieval ethnology. This Revivalist upsurge investigated Cornwall's pre-industrial culture, using the Cornish language as the "principal badge of [Cornish] nationality and ethnic kinship". The first effective revival of Cornish began in 1904 when Henry Jenner, a Celtic language enthusiast, published his book Handbook of the Cornish Language. His orthography, Unified Cornish, was based on Cornish as it was spoken in the 18th century, although his pupil Robert Morton Nance later steered the revival more towards the Middle Cornish that had been used in the 16th century, before the language became influenced by English.

The visit of King George IV to Scotland in 1822 reinvigorated Scottish national identity, melding it with romanticist notions of tartan, kilts and the Scottish Highlands. As Pan-Celticism gathered pace in the early 20th century, Cornishman L. C. R. Duncombe-Jewell and the Cowethas Kelto-Kernuak (a Cornish language interest group) asserted the use of Cornish kilts and tartans as a "national dress ... common to all Celtic countries". In 1924 the Federation of Old Cornwall Societies was formed to facilitate, preserve and maintain Celticity in Cornwall, followed by the similar Gorseth Kernow in 1928, and the formation of the Cornish nationalist political party Mebyon Kernow in 1951. Increased interest and communication across the Celtic nations in Celtic languages and culture during the 1960s and 1970s spurred on the popularisation of the Cornish self-government movement. Since devolution in Scotland, Wales and Northern Ireland, enthusiasts for Cornish culture have pressed for the Cornish language to be taught formally in Cornish schools, while Cornish nationalists have demanded greater political autonomy for Cornwall, for example that it be constituted as the United Kingdom's fifth constituent country with its own Cornish Assembly.

== Geographic distribution ==
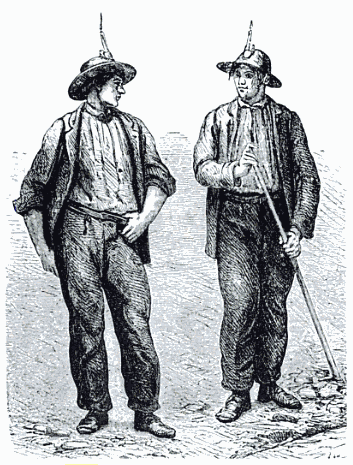
Cornish miners in the mid-19th century. A demise in mining in Cornwall prompted an exodus of Cornish miners and families resulting in a displaced Cornish diaspora.

The Cornish people are concentrated in Cornwall, but after the Age of Discovery in the early modern period were involved in the British colonisation of the Americas and other transcontinental and transatlantic migrations. Initially, the number of migrants was comparatively small, with those who left Cornwall typically settling in North America or else amongst the ports and plantations of the Caribbean.

In the first half of the 19th century, the Cornish people were leaders in tin and copper smelting, while mining in Cornwall was the people's major occupation. Increased competition from Australia, British Malaya and Bolivia, coupled with the depletion of mineral deposits brought about an economic decline for Cornish mining lasting half a century, and prompting mass human migration from Cornwall. In each decade from 1861 to 1901, "around 20% of the Cornish male population migrated abroad"—three times that of the average of England and Wales—and totalling over a quarter of a million people lost to emigration between 1841 and 1901. There was a displacement of skilled Cornish engineers, farmers, merchants, miners and tradesmen, but their commercial and occupational expertise, particularly in hard rock mining, was highly valued by the communities they met. Within Great Britain, Cornish families were attracted from Cornwall to North East England—particularly on Teesside—to partake in coal mining as a means to earn wealth by using their mining skill. This has resulted in a concentration of Cornish names on and around Teesside that persists into the 21st century.

Large numbers of the 19th century Cornish emigrants eventually returned to Cornwall, whilst the rate of emigration from Cornwall declined after World War I. However, the global connections of the remaining Cornish diaspora, which is concentrated in English-speaking countries such as Australia, Canada, South Africa and the United States, are "very strong". Their outreach has contributed to the international spread of Methodism, a movement within Protestant Christianity that was popular with the Cornish people at the time of their mass migration. "Cousin Jacks" is a nickname for the overseas Cornish, thought to derive from the practice of Cornishmen asking if job vacancies could be filled by their cousin named Jack in Cornwall.

=== Australia ===
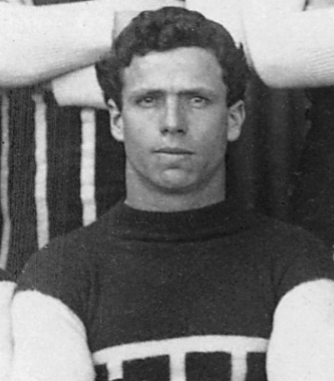
William "Harold" Oliver was the son of Australian Cornish immigrants who lived in the mining town of Waukaringa. Harold Oliver was a three time national champion with the Port Adelaide Football Club in 1910, 1913 and 1914.

From the beginning of Australia's colonial period until after the Second World War, people from the United Kingdom made up a large majority of people coming to Australia, meaning that many Australian-born people can trace their origins to Britain. The Cornish people in particular were actively encouraged to emigrate to Australia following the demise of Cornish mining in the 19th century. A "vigorous recruiting campaign" was launched to encourage the Cornish to aid with mining in Australia because of their experience and expertise. Free passage to South Australia in particular was granted to hundreds of Cornish miners and their families, so much so, that a large Cornish community gathered in Australia's Copper Coast, and South Australia's Yorke Peninsula became known as "Little Cornwall". It has been estimated between 1837 and 1840, 15 per cent of all assisted migrants to South Australia were Cornish.

Cornish settlement impacted upon social, cultural and religious life throughout the history of South Australia. Cornish identity was embraced strongly in the Yorke Peninsula, but also in the more outlying mining towns of Kapunda and Burra, where Cornish miners constituted a sizeable community. Methodism, was the main form of religious practice for the Cornish. Methodist sensibilities were held with strong conviction by the migrant Cornish in a direct rivalry with Catholic Irish people in Australia. The Kernewek Lowender is the largest Cornish festival in the world, held in the Kadina, Moonta and Wallaroo towns on the Yorke Peninsula, which attracts tens of thousands of visitors bi-annually.

=== Canada ===
European fishing ventures in and around Newfoundland during the 16th century were the earliest Cornish activity in what was to become Canada. However, permanent settlement by the Cornish across the Atlantic Ocean was rare until at least the 19th century. The British colonisation of the Americas encouraged additional migration of the Cornish to the Canadas, particularly by those who served in Great Britain's Royal Navy. The creation of the colony of British North America spurred more people from Cornwall to settle in North America; they were registered as English migrants. Many Cornish (and other West Country) immigrants who had been agricultural labourers settled in an area of what is now South Central Ontario in what were the counties of Northumberland, Durham and Ontario, ranging from the towns of Port Hope and Cobourg in the east, to Whitby in the west and to the north ends of those counties.

=== Mexico ===
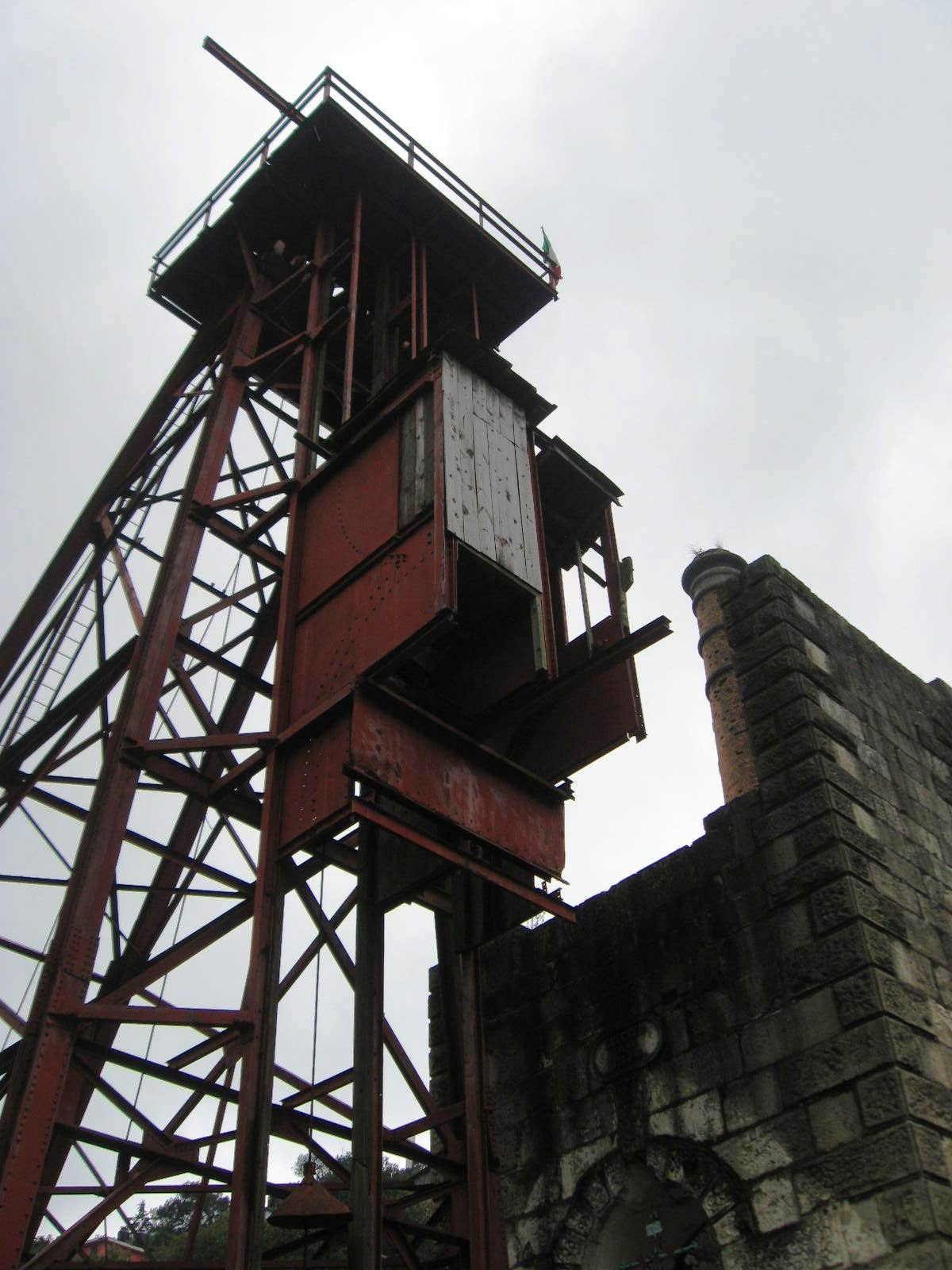
A silver mining museum in Mineral del Monte, a remnant of the Cornish migration to Mexico during the early-19th century.

In 1825 a band of 60 Cornishmen left Falmouth for Mineral del Monte in central Mexico with 1,500 tonnes (1,500 long tons; 1,700 short tons) of mining machinery with which to apply their mining skill and technologies to resuscitate Mexico's ailing silver mining industry after the neglect caused by the Mexican War of Independence. Following their sea voyage they attempted to dock at Veracruz but were forced away by the Spanish to a beach at Mocambo from where they hauled their machinery through jungle and swamp to Santa Fe. During this haul through the jungle, the Cornishmen and their Mexican helpers fell victim to yellow fever, resulting in 30 Cornish and 100 Mexican fatalities. The fever forced the survivors to abandon their equipment and head inland up into the mountains to Xalapa to try to escape the mosquitos for three months, until the end of the rainy season. Once the rainy season closed the Cornish and Mexican miners continued their 250-mile (402 km) "Great Trek" to Mineral del Monte, transporting their machinery to an altitude of 10,000 feet (3,048 m) above sea level and arriving at their destination on 1 May 1826. Following their arrival, the Cornish community flourished and stayed in central Mexico until the Mexican Revolution in 1910. Although the Cornish community in Mexico broadly returned to Cornwall, they left a cultural legacy; Cornish pasties, Cornish mining museums and a Cornish Mexican Cultural Society are all part of the local heritage and tradition in and around Mineral del Monte.

=== South Africa ===
The Witwatersrand Gold Rush of 1886 encouraged large numbers of Cornish miners to migrate to the South African Republic. Although an international gold rush, the Cornish overwhelmingly formed the skilled labour force in the Witwatersrand, until the outbreak of the Second Boer War prompted a retreat.

=== United States ===
The discovery of lead ore and copper in North America prompted an influx of Cornish miners to the continent, particularly around the Upper Mississippi River. By the early 19th century Cornish people were present in the Upper Peninsula of Michigan—particularly the mining town of Ishpeming. Additional waves of Cornish migrants followed the California Gold Rush of the mid-19th century; in the 1890s it was estimated that in California's Grass Valley, over 60 per cent of the population was Cornish. It has a tradition of carols stemming from the Cornish who settled the area as gold miners in the 19th century. The carols have become "the identity of the town", some of the members of the Grass Valley Cornish Carol Choir are descendants of the original Cornish settlers.

Most migratory Cornish to the United States were classified as English or British, meaning that the precise number of Cornish Americans is difficult to estimate. The aggregate number of immigrants from Cornwall to the United States before World War I is suggested to be around 100,000.

== Culture ==
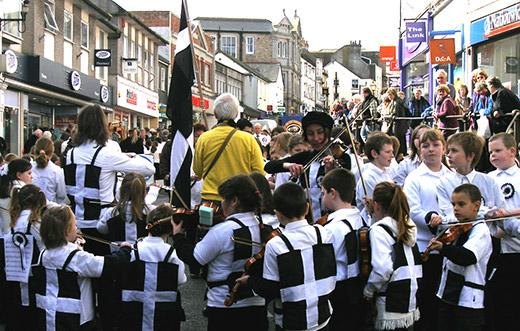
St. Piran's Day is an annual patronal Cornish festival celebrating Cornish culture and history every 5 March.

The survival of a distinct Cornish culture has been attributed to Cornwall's geographic isolation. Contemporaneously, the underlying notion of Cornish culture is that it is distinct from the culture of England, despite its anglicisation, and that it is instead part of a Celtic tradition. According to American academic Paul Robert Magocsi, modern-day Cornish activists have claimed several Victorian era inventions including the Cornish engine, Christmas carols, rugby football and brass bands as part of this Cornish tradition. Cornish cultural tradition is most strongly associated with the people's most historical occupation, mining, an aspect of Cornish history and culture that has influenced its cuisine, symbols and identity. The Cornish writer C. C. Vyvyan wrote in her 1948 book Our Cornwall: "A man might live and die among us and never gain throughout his allotted span of life one glimpse of the essential Cornwall or the essential Cornishman."

Cornwall has its own tradition of Christian saints, derived from Celtic extraction, that have given rise to localised dedications. Saint Piran is the 5th century Christian abbot, supposedly of Irish origin, who is patron saint of both tin miners and Cornwall. According to popular mythology, Piran, an Irish scholar who studied Christianity in Ancient Rome was to be drowned in the Irish Sea by the High Kings of Ireland, but instead floated across to Perranporth in Cornwall by the will of God to preach the Gospel. Saint Piran's Flag, a centred white cross on a black field, was described as the "Standard of Cornwall" in 1838 and was re-introduced by Celtic Revivalists thereafter as a county flag of Cornwall. It has been seized upon by the Cornish people as a symbol of their identity, displayed on cars and flying from buildings including those of Cornwall Council. St Piran's Day is an annual patronal fête, and the pre-eminent Cornish festival celebrating Cornish culture and history on 5 March.

=== Language ===
A Cornish speaker, recorded in Truro

The Cornish language is derived from the Brythonic branch of the Insular Celtic languages. It is closely related to the Breton language, and to a lesser extent shares commonalities with the Welsh language, although they are not mutually intelligible. The language functioned as a community language in Cornwall until a language shift to the English language was completed during the late 18th century. The demise of the Cornish language is attributed to English cultural influence, particularly the political and religious dominance of the English Reformation and the Act of Uniformity 1549 which outlawed all church services within the kingdom of England that were not in English. The exact date of the death of using the Cornish language is unclear and disputed, but popularly it is claimed that the last monolingual Cornish speaker was Dolly Pentreath, a Mousehole resident who died in 1777.

Sign in a cafe in Penzance indicating Cornish-language service

The revival of Cornish began in 1904 when Henry Jenner, a Celtic language enthusiast, published his book Handbook of the Cornish Language. He based his work on Cornish as it was spoken in the 18th century, although his pupil Robert Morton Nance, with his orthography, Unified Cornish, later steered the revival more towards the Middle Cornish that had been used in the 16th century, before the language became more heavily influenced by English. This set the tone for the next few decades; as the revival gained pace, learners of the language disagreed on which style of Cornish to use, and a number of competing orthographies—Unified Cornish, Unified Cornish Revised, Modern Cornish, Kernewek Kemmyn—were in use by the end of the 20th century. A standard written form was agreed in 2008.

Newer buses in Cornwall have bilingual signage

Cornish is a restored and living modern language, but most of its speakers are enthusiasts, persons who have learned the language through private study. Cornish speakers are geographically dispersed, meaning there is no part of Cornwall where it is spoken as a community language. As of 2009, it is taught in fifty primary schools, although regular broadcast in Cornish is limited to a weekly bilingual programme on BBC Radio Cornwall. Daily life in Cornwall therefore is conducted in the English language, albeit with some regional peculiarities.

Legends of the Fall, a novella by American author Jim Harrison, detailing the lives of a Cornish American family in the early 20th century, contains several Cornish language terms. These were also included in the Academy Award winning film of the same name starring Anthony Hopkins as Col. William Ludlow and Brad Pitt as Tristan Ludlow.

=== Literature and folklore ===
Early medieval Cornwall was associated with the Matter of Britain, a national myth recounting a legendary Celtic history of Brittonic warriors, including King Arthur. The Matter of Britain was supported by texts such as the Historia Regum Britanniae, a pseudohistorical account of the history of the ancient Britons, written in the mid-12th century by Geoffrey of Monmouth. The Historia Regum Britanniae chronicled the lives of legendary kings of the Britons in a narrative spanning a time of two thousand years, beginning with the Trojans founding the ancient British nation and continuing until the Anglo-Saxon invasion of Britain in the 5th century forced the Celtic Britons to the west coast, namely Wales and Cornwall. Although broadly thought of as a work of fiction, Geoffrey of Monmouth's work had a lasting effect upon the identity of the Cornish. His "historical construct" characterised the ancient Britons as heroes, which later helped Celtic revivalists to redefine Cornishness as an identity closely related to ancient heroic Celtic folklore.

Another strand of Cornish folklore is derived from tales of seafaring pirates and smugglers who thrived in and around Cornwall from the early modern period through to the 19th century. Cornish pirates exploited both their knowledge of the Cornish coastline as well as its sheltered creeks and hidden anchorages. For many fishing villages, loot and contraband provided by pirates supported a strong and secretive underground economy in Cornwall.

Legendary creatures that appear in Cornish folklore include buccas, knockers and piskies. Tales of these creatures are thought to have developed as supernatural explanations for the frequent and deadly cave-ins that occurred during 18th-century Cornish tin mining, or else a creation of the oxygen-starved minds of exhausted miners who returned from the underground.

=== Performing and visual arts ===
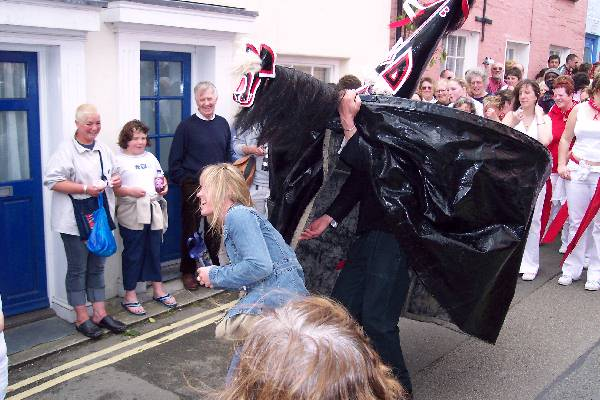
The 'Obby 'Oss festival is a Cornish May Day festival celebrated in Padstow.

Celtic crosses, many dating from between the 7th and 15th centuries, are found in Cornwall and have been used as inspiration in modern and contemporary Cornish visual arts. In the 1780s, John Opie was the first Cornish-born painter to gain widespread attention; his work was exhibited at the Royal Academy and he was described by Joshua Reynolds as "like Caravaggio and Velázquez in one". Artists who appreciated the quality of Cornwall's natural light, such as J. M. W. Turner, began to visit, with more following after the opening of the Great Western Railway, including Whistler and Sickert. Stanhope Forbes and Frank Bramley settled in Cornwall in the 1880s, establishing the Newlyn School of painting en plein air. By the 1920s, the ceramicist Bernard Leach was established at St Ives, and the St Ives School for abstract artists formed there, influenced by naive painters such as Alfred Wallis, and involving the work of Ben Nicholson, his wife Barbara Hepworth, Naum Gabo and Patrick Heron.

=== Religion ===
Anciently, the religion of the Cornish Britons was Celtic polytheism, a pagan, animistic faith, assumed to be led by Druids in full or in part. Early Christianity is thought to have existed in Cornwall during the 1st century, but limited to individual travellers and visitors, possibly including Priscillian, a Galician theologian who may have been exiled to the Isles of Scilly. Celtic Christianity was introduced to Cornwall in the year 520 by Saint Petroc, a Brython from the kingdom of Glywysing, and other missionaries from Wales, as well as by Gaelic monks and holy women from Ireland; this "formative period" has left a legacy of granite high cross monuments throughout Cornwall. Dedications to many different Cornish saints can also be traced to this period. In the Middle Ages, Roman Catholicism was dominant in Cornwall, and even in the 17th century the Cornish were "fervently Roman Catholic", slow to accept the Protestant Reformation, according to some scholars. The adoption of Anglicanism was, eventually, near-universal in Cornwall and facilitated the anglicisation of the Cornish people. A variety of dissenting congregations such as the Quakers and Baptists were to be found in certain districts. Through a combination of tours of Cornwall by John Wesley, rural isolation and compatibility with Cornish tastes and sensibilities, Methodism, an evangelical revival movement within the Church of England, became the form of Christianity practised by the majority of the population all over Cornwall during the 19th century. During this time other kinds of Methodist churches appeared such as the Bible Christians and there were also Evangelical and Anglo-Catholic revivals within the Church of England.

There is a significant neopagan presence in Cornwall, with paganism being the third-largest religion after Christianity and Buddhism.

=== Cuisine ===
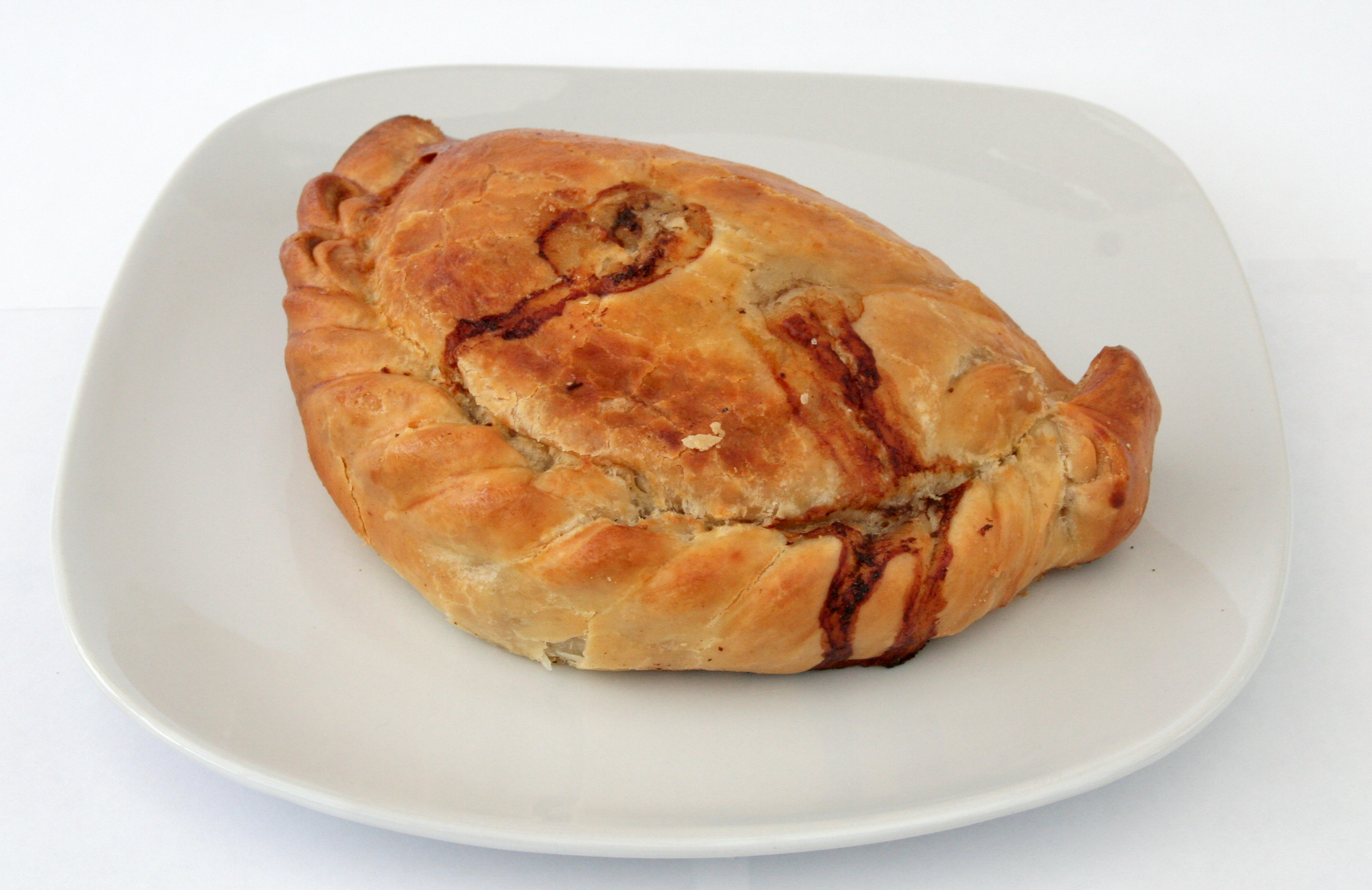
A Cornish pasty

Cornish cuisine is a regional variety of British cuisine, strongly rooted in a tradition of using local produce, which is used to create relatively simple dishes. Most prominent in Cornish cuisine is the pasty (sometimes known as the Cornish pasty) made from diced beef, potato, onion and swede (commonly called 'turnip' by the Cornish), enclosed within a pastry crust and then baked. One idea of its origins suggests that it evolved as a portable lunch for Cornish miners, the crust serving as a disposable handle that could be held by a miner's hand without soiling the filling. Fish was an important element of the Cornish diet, but international commercial fishing was also well established by the 16th century, and tons of pilchards were exported from Cornwall to France, Italy and Spain every year. Stargazy pie is an occasional festive Cornish dish with the heads of fish standing on their tails, originally pilchards, piercing a pastry crust. The saffron bun, also known as the tea treat bun, is a sweet bread with its origins in Cornwall.

=== Sport ===
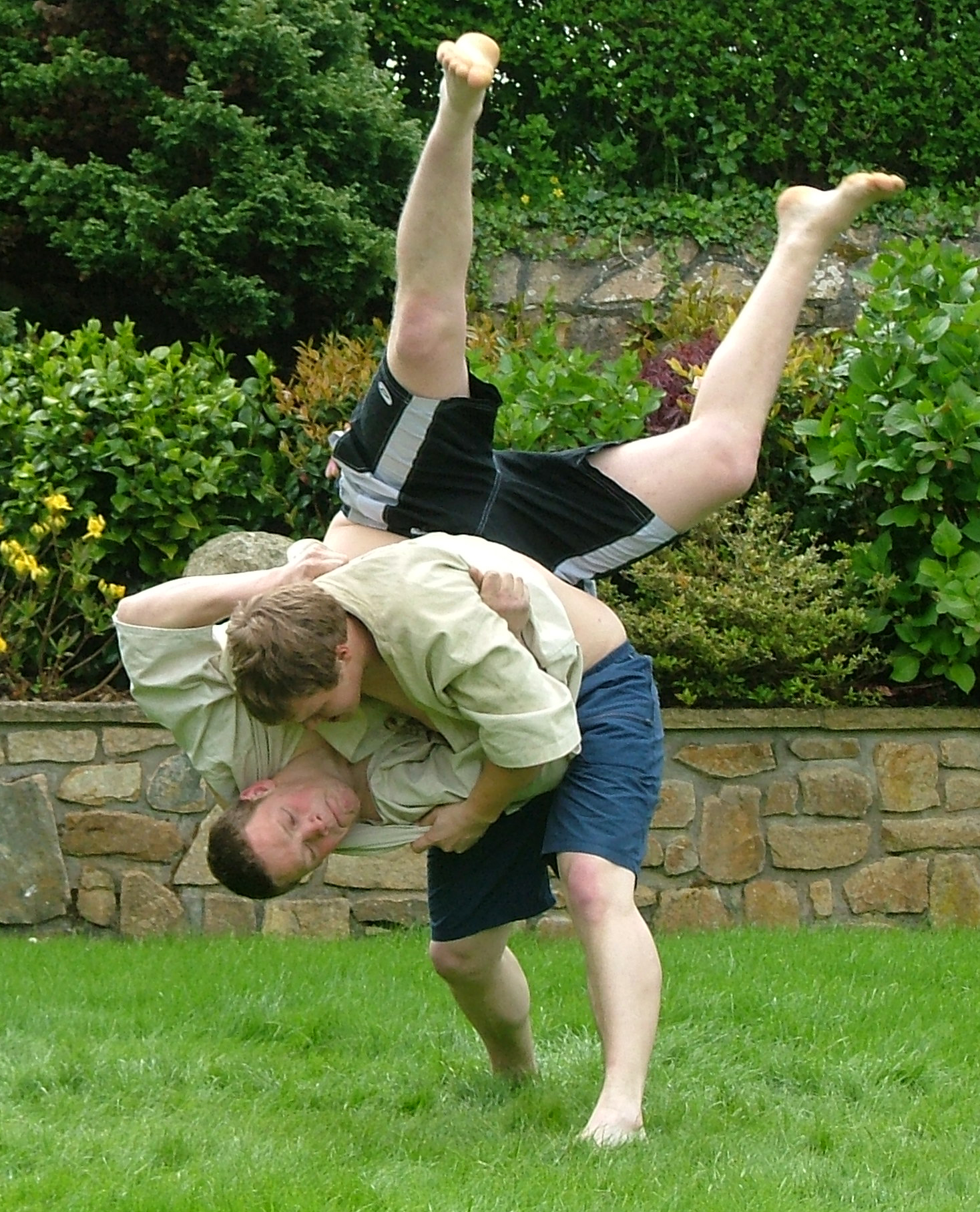
Cornish wrestling is a contact sport, a style of folk martial arts, that has its origins in Cornwall

With its comparatively small, rural population, major contribution by the Cornish to national sport in the United Kingdom has been limited. There are no teams affiliated to the Cornwall County Football Association that play in the Football League of England and Wales, and the Cornwall County Cricket Club plays as one of the minor counties of English cricket. Viewed as an "important identifier of ethnic affiliation", rugby union has become a sport strongly tied with notions of Cornishness, and since the 20th century, rugby union in Cornwall has emerged as one of the most popular spectator and team sports in Cornwall, with professional Cornish rugby footballers being described as a "formidable force", "naturally independent, both in thought and deed, yet paradoxically staunch English patriots whose top players have represented England with pride and passion". In 1985, sports journalist Alan Gibson made a direct connection between love of rugby in Cornwall and the ancient parish games of hurling and wrestling that existed for centuries before rugby officially began.

Cornish wrestling (also known as Wrasslin') is a regional, folk style of grappling or martial arts. The Cornwall County Wrestling Association was formed in 1923, to standardise the rules of the sport and to promote Cornish wrestling throughout Cornwall and the world. Together with Cornish hurling (a localised form of medieval football), Wrasslin' has been promoted as a distinctly Celtic game, tied closely with Cornish identity.

Surfing was popularised in Cornwall during the late 20th century, and has since become readily associated with Cornishness. The waves around the Cornish coastline are created by low pressure systems from the Atlantic Ocean which unleash powerful swells eastwards creating multiple, excellent surfing conditions in some parts of the coast of Cornwall. Newquay, one of Britain's "premier surfing towns", regularly hosts world championship surfing events.

== Institutions and politics ==
The surviving part of the former Duchy Palace in Lostwithiel, the former administrative seat of the Duke of Cornwall from c. 1265 to 1874

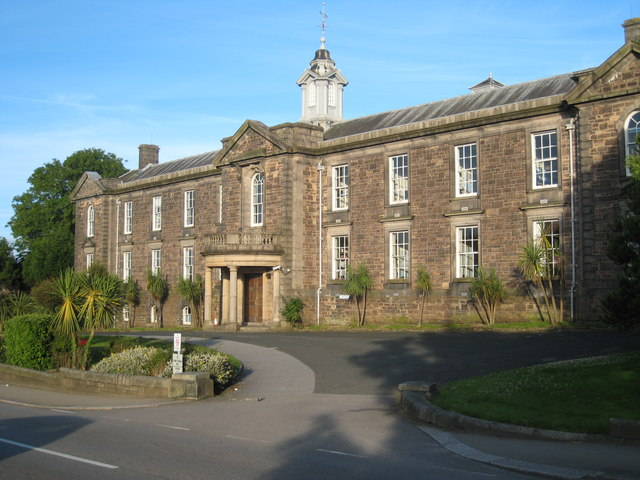
The Old County Hall in Truro, the former seat of Cornwall Council

The politics of Cornwall take place within a wider national political framework of a constitutional monarchy, in which the United Kingdom's monarch is head of state and the prime minister of the United Kingdom is the head of government. Cornish politics are marked by a long tradition of Liberalism.

Important historical institutions were the Duchy of Cornwall and the Cornish Stannary Courts and Parliaments. The Stannary court administered equity, through special laws and legal exemptions, for all matters relating to the tin mines and tin trade in Cornwall. Cornish miners were effectively exempt from the jurisdiction of the law courts at Westminster, except "in such cases as should affect land, life or limb". The ancient privileges of the Stannary Courts and Parliaments were confirmed by successive Royal Charters in the Middle Ages, including those administered by Kings John, Edward I and Edward III of England. As the tin mines of Cornwall lost their economic importance during the 18th and 19th centuries, so the Stannary institutions lost political power. The last Stannary parliament was held at Truro in 1752, and continued, by adjournments, until 11 September 1753.

As in the rest of Great Britain, the Liberal Party dominated Cornish politics during the 19th century, although socialism gained limited support in western Cornwall, and the Labour Party won preference after World War I. Nationalism (or regionalism) in Cornwall traces its roots to the Irish Home Rule bills of the late 19th century, and is represented by the Cornish self-government movement, a political action group that is predominantly organised to promote Cornwall as the national homeland of the Cornish, campaign for devolution, and win it the status as a fifth country within the UK rather than outright separatism. More "militant" variants of Cornish nationalism however claim that because of historical constitutional peculiarities regarding the status of Cornwall, the law of the European Union does or should not have jurisdiction over Cornwall until Cornish sovereignty is recognised. Popularisation of Cornish nationalism is attributed to a Celtic cultural revival in Cornwall which itself began with a renewed interest in the Cornish language in the 1920s. The revival of the Cornish language encouraged a parallel revival of Celtic traditions, which by the 1970s had spurred on Cornish nationalism. The United Kingdom's entry into the European Economic Community in 1973 prompted claims that the Cornish should be granted their own devolved national assembly—the Cornish Assembly—comparable to that of the National Assembly for Wales. Mebyon Kernow is a left-wing political party based in Cornwall, founded in 1951. Its main objective is attaining greater autonomy for Cornwall through the establishment of a legislative Cornish Assembly. As at 2009 Mebyon Kernow has no Members of Parliament elected to the House of Commons of the United Kingdom, and in the 2009 United Kingdom local elections received 4 per cent of votes to elect councillors to Cornwall Council, behind the Conservative Party (34 per cent), Liberal Democrats (28 per cent), and Independents (23 per cent) Since the 2009 structural changes to local government in England, Cornwall Council has been a unitary authority, serving as the sole executive, deliberative, and legislative body responsible for local policy, setting council tax, and allocating budgets.

Following the Cornwall Council election in May 2013, the council remained as "no overall control", with the Independent politicians becoming the largest grouping on the council through a modest gain of councillors from the previous election. The Liberal Democrats remained the second largest party after losing 2 councillors and the Conservatives slipped to third after losing over a third of their councillors. The Labour Party (+8), UKIP (+6), and the Green Party (+1) all gained seats, with UKIP and the Greens entering Cornwall Council for the first time. Mebyon Kernow had 6 councillors before the election, having added 2 since the 2009 election, their total following the election was reduced to 4.

In the 2015 general election all Cornish seats were won by the Conservatives. This was repeated in the 2017 general election.

A study was carried out by J. M. A. Willett, R. Tidy, Garry Tregidga et al. through Exeter University using data from January to April 2017 to understand why Cornwall voted leave in the Brexit referendum when it benefitted greatly from EU funding, such as the Cornwall and Isles of Scilly Growth Programme which was worth £600 million and supported over a hundred projects such infrastructure, agriculture, employment and low carbon initiatives. In this study people from lots of different backgrounds and jobs where interviewed and asked about their reasoning for voting leave, farmers described the EU policies as being overly complicated and taking the "fun" out of farming, many had issues with infrastructure and many others stated that with Brexit they were reclaiming sovereignty from the EU and there were underlying issues with the EUs lack of border control. It was found that the what linked the reasoning for leaving the EU was the uncertainty that they were experiencing, their inability to get any real change even with the EUs funding and a lack of knowledge about where the funding was spent as a whole.

In the UK's 2021 census plans, a "tickbox" for claiming "Cornish" as a national minority status has not been implemented and is under debate. Since Cornwall was officially given "official national minority status" in 2014, the Cornwall Council's Party Leaders have submitted a letter to the cabinet office of Chloe Smith for the Minister of State. In the coming weeks, Parliament is set to debate The Census Order. If enough Members of Parliament side with the Cornish people and stand in solidarity with their cause, a box to select a "Cornish" identity could be added—reaffirming the official identity they established 6 years prior.

== See also ==
- List of people from Cornwall
- List of topics related to Cornwall
