= Old gold =

Dark yellow or brownish color

Color coordinates
- Hex triplet: #CFB53B
- sRGB^{B} (r, g, b): (207, 181, 59)
- HSV (h, s, v): (49°, 71%, 81%)
- CIELCh_{uv} (L, C, h): (74, 74, 72°)
- Source: /Maerz and Paul
- ISCC–NBS descriptor: Strong yellow
- B: Normalized to [0–255] (byte)

Old gold is a dark yellow, which varies from light olive or olive brown to deep or strong yellow, generally on the darker side of this range.

The first recorded use of old gold as a color name in English was in the early 19th century (exact year uncertain).

== In culture ==
=== Politics ===
- Old gold is used as a political colour by Mebyon Kernow, a Cornish nationalist party. The colour is derived from Cornish kilts and tartans.

=== Sports ===
- The first ever recorded use of Old Gold for a sports team was when it was adopted by the Purdue University football team in 1887
- Old gold is used for some NFL teams: the New Orleans Saints and the San Francisco 49ers. The reason for its use by the Saints is that New Orleans is an old city with the heritage and architecture of regal Europe. The reason for its use by the 49ers is the close identification of San Francisco (indeed the very choice of the mascot name) with the California Gold Rush of 1849.. The old gold is also one of the colours of Johns Hopkins University.
- The home shirts worn by English football club Wolverhampton Wanderers F.C. are traditionally old gold in colour.
- The primary colours of the Purdue University Boilermakers, the Wake Forest University Demon Deacons, and the DePauw University Tigers are old gold and black.
- The primary colours of the Georgia Tech Yellow Jackets are old gold and white.
- Welsh football team Carmarthen Town A.F.C are known as the Old Gold (Hen Aur in Welsh) and play in old gold shirts.

== See also ==
- List of colours
