= Rosevear (surname) =

Rosevear is a British (Cornish) surname. Rosevear and Roseveare are derived from either of two places so called in Cornwall (one is in Mawgan in Meneage and the other in Treverbyn: these place names have different origins).

Notable people with the surname include:

- Craig Rosevear, Australian drummer, auctioneer and TV presenter
- Donovan Reginald Rosevear (1900 - 1986), British forester and mammalogist
- John Rosevear (died 1881), Canadian politician
- Paul Rosevear, of the American band The Vice Rags
- Sol Rosevear (1892–1953), Australian politician
- Stanley Wallace Rosevear (1896–1918), Canadian WWI flying ace

== See also ==
- Roseveare
