= Martin Roseveare =

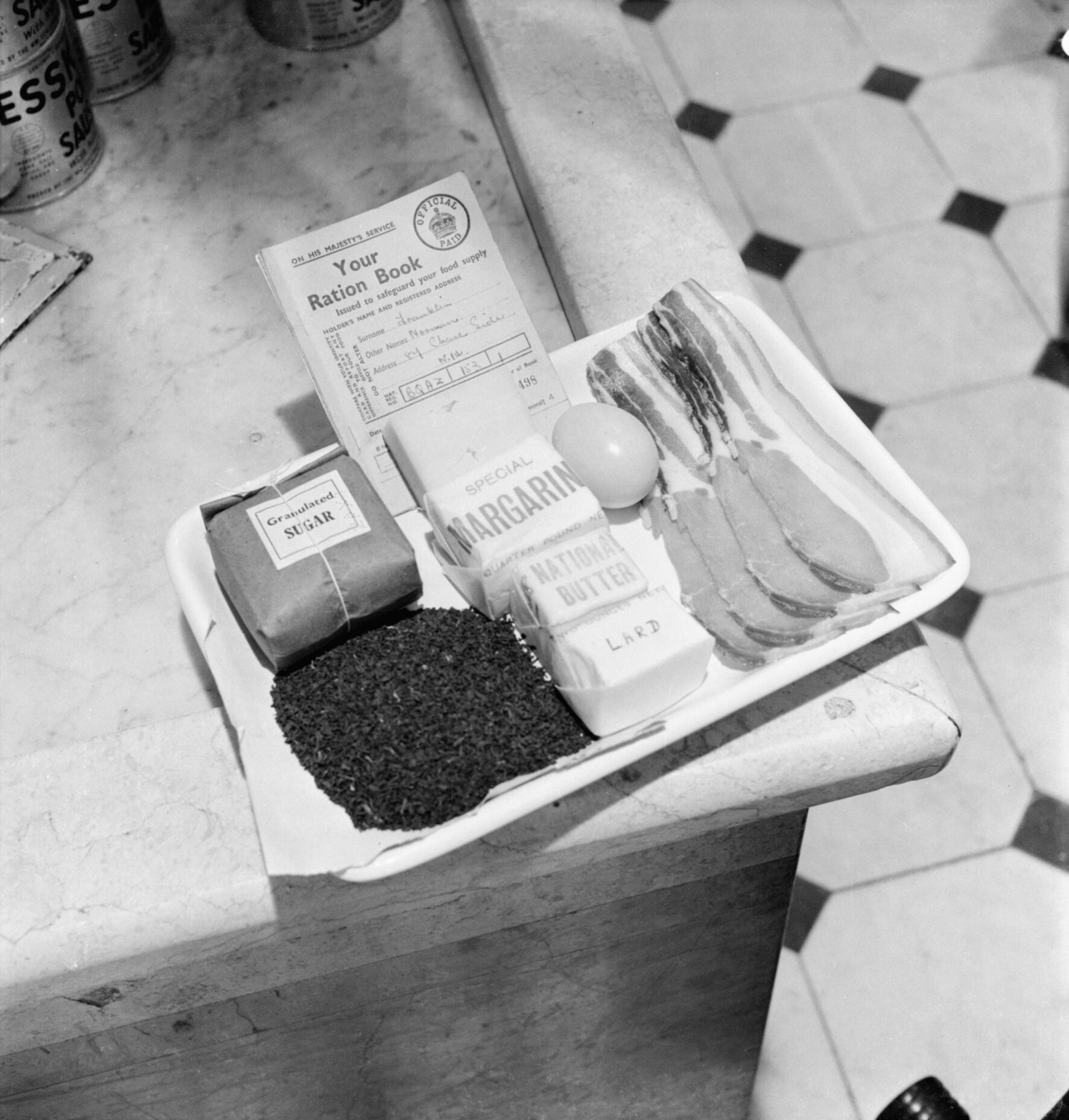
Tray containing a ration book and the weekly ration as issued to an adult in Britain during 1942

Martin Pearson Roseveare (24 April 1898, in Great Snoring – 30 March 1985, in Mzuzu, Malawi) was an English mathematician responsible for designing the ration books for the United Kingdom used during the Second World War.

Martin attended Marlborough College thanks to winning a scholarship, then proceeding to St. John's College, Cambridge, where he studied mathematics. During the First World War he served in the Royal Field Artillery, being wounded in Amiens in 1918. He returned to Cambridge and finished his studies in 1921 and took up a post teaching mathematics at Repton School. He transferred to Haileybury School in 1923. He joined the Inspectorate of Schools in 1927.

Lord Woolton, the Minister of Food asked him to design a "foolproof and fraudproof" ration book. He piloted his original ideas amongst housewives before establishing a 38-page booklet with coupons for clothing and food which would then be cut out by shopkeepers.

He married Edith Mary Pearce in 1921, with whom he had one son and four daughters. His son Bob Roseveare (1923–2004) became a code breaker and his daughter Helen Roseveare (1925–2016) became a missionary. He separated from his wife in 1954 and moved to Mzuzu then located in the Nyasaland Protectorate. Following his divorce in 1958, he married Olivia Margaret Montgomery.

He published Joys, Jobs and Jaunts: Memoirs of Sir Martin Roseveare in 1984.
