= Cornish kilts and tartans =

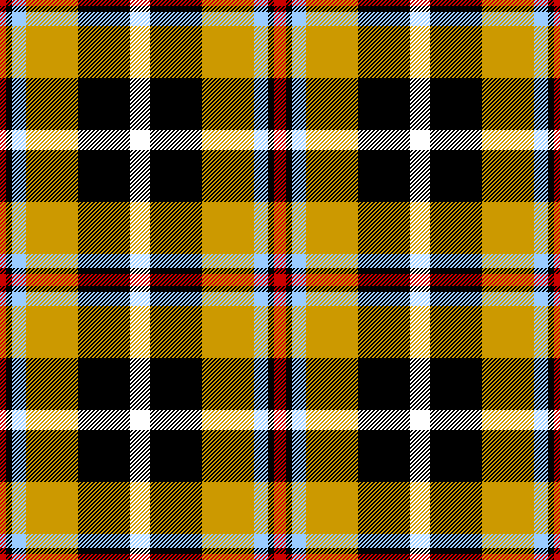
Cornwall's national tartan

Cornish kilts and tartans are thought to be a modern tradition started in the early to mid 20th century. The first modern kilt was plain black, and other patterns followed. It is documented that a garment known as a bracca (a reddish checkered tunic) was worn by Celtic people who inhabited the British Isles, the term indicating its appearance. The Welsh word brech means 'checkered' (compare the cognate Scottish Gaelic breac, 'variegated, freckled'), and the word bracca is derived from the Welsh or Cornish word brythen which in English translates as 'striped' or 'checkered'.

Cornish historian L. C. R. Duncombe-Jewell attempted to prove that plain kilts were in use in Cornwall. He discovered carvings of minstrels dressed in what he interpreted as kilts and playing bagpipes on bench ends at Altarnun church, which dated from circa 1510. The earliest historical reference to the Cornish kilt is from 1903, when the aforementioned Duncombe-Jewell appeared in a woad-blue kilt as the Cornish delegate to the Celtic Congress, convening at Caernarvon. John T. Koch in his work Celtic Culture: A Historical Encyclopedia mentions a black kilt worn by the Duke of Cornwall's Light Infantry in combat; however, no historical reference is provided to support this claim.

== National tartans ==
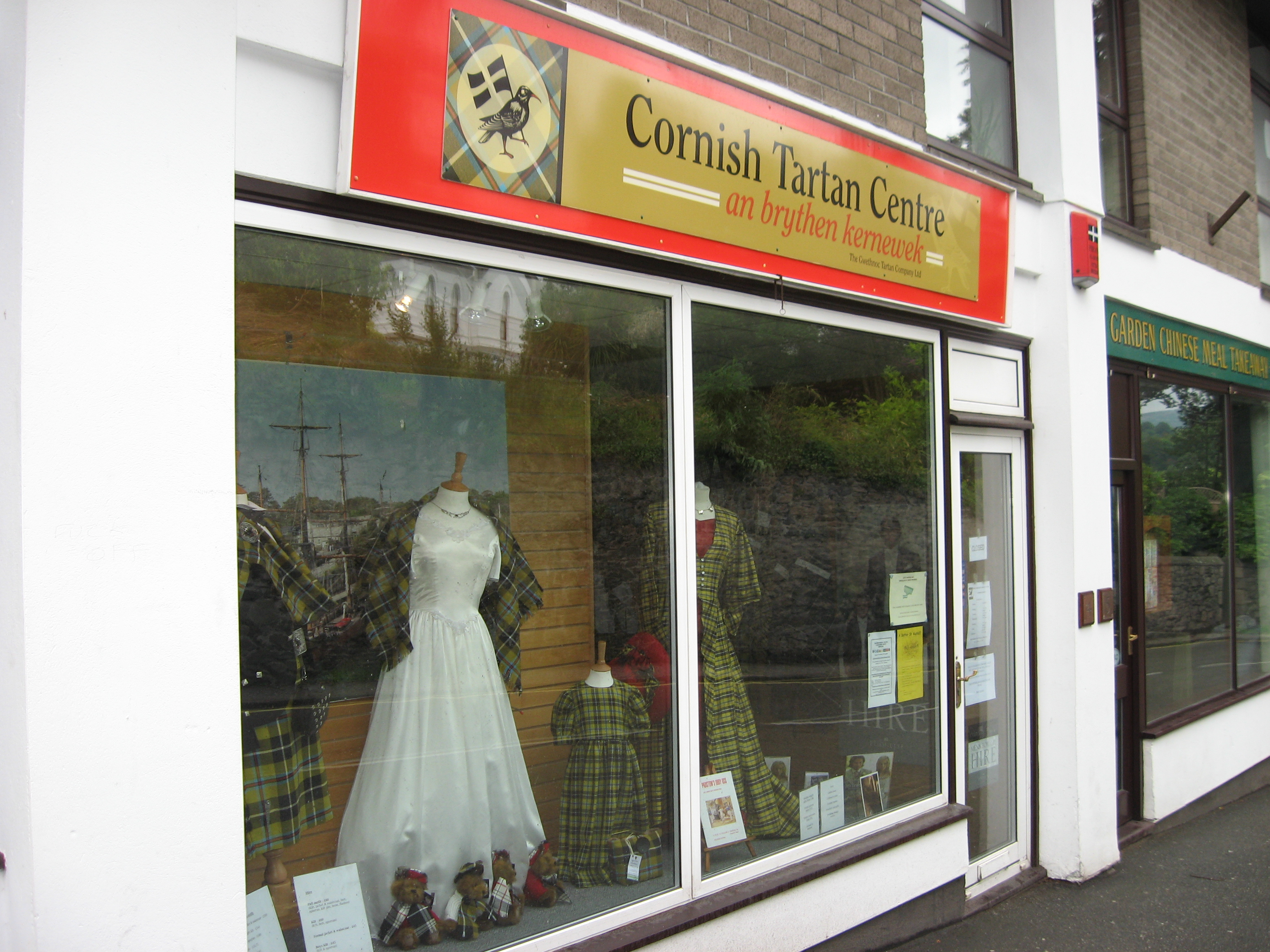
Cornish tartan shop in St Austell

First created in 1963, the Cornish National tartan was designed by the poet E. E. Morton Nance, nephew of Robert Morton Nance. Each colour of tartan has a special significance or meaning. The white cross on a black background is from the banner of Saint Piran, the patron saint of tinners, which is also used as the flag of Cornwall; Black and gold were the colours of the ancient Kings of Dumnonia; red for legs and beak of the national bird, the Cornish chough, and blue for the blue of the sea surrounding Cornwall. A prototype of the Cornish national tartan was first worn by Morton-Nance in the 1963 Celtic Congress held at Carbis Bay attached to a Clan Douglas kilt that he was wearing for the occasion. The Cornish Hunting Tartan was registered in 1984.

The following Cornish tartans have been registered with the Scottish Tartans Authority (reference numbers shown below), and thus are also included in the newer database of the Scottish Register of Tartans.

National tartans
Image	Name	Notes
	Cornish National tartan	STA no. 1567
	Cornish Hunting tartan	STA no. 1568
	Cornish Flag tartan	STA no. 1618
	St Piran's Dress tartan	STA no. 1685
	Cornish National Day tartan	STA no. 1262

== Family tartans ==
Several tartans for Cornish families have been created and registered in modern times, e.g. for family get-togethers and weddings. Most of the following have been registered with the Scottish Tartans Authority or with Scottish Tartans World Register (reference numbers shown below, where applicable), and thus are also included in the newer database of the Scottish Register of Tartans.

Cornish family tartans
Image	Family	Notes
	Christopher	STA no. 2809
	Curnow	STA no. 4084
	Jewell	STA no. 7478
	Pascoe	
	Pengelly	STWR no. 3145
	Rosevear	STA no. 2541
	Southcott	
