= Bob Roseveare =

British codebreaker and schoolteacher

Robert Arthur (Bob) Roseveare (23 May 1923 – 8 December 2004) was an English codebreaker at Bletchley Park during World War II and later a schoolteacher.

He was born at Repton, Derbyshire where his father, Sir Martin Roseveare, taught at Repton School. He won a scholarship to Marlborough College, Wiltshire, where he studied from 1936 to 1941.

In 1942 Roseveare and fellow Marlborough student Nigel Forward were recruited by Gordon Welchman (who also went to Marlborough College) for Hut 6 at Bletchley Park where they worked on German Air Force (Luftwaffe) Enigma messages. Roseveare started in the Watch, then moved to the Quatch, a small backroom group that decoded non-current messages. When Germany surrendered, Bob moved to the Japanese section, until August 1945.

Roseveare met his future wife in Hut 6, Ione Jay, full name Katherine Ione Jay. They married on 7 August 1947, with Derek Taunt as best man. His friend from Marlborough, Nigel Forward, Dennis Babbage and three others in Hut 6 also met their wives there.

After leaving Bletchley Park, Roseveare took up a scholarship he had won in 1941 to St John's College, Cambridge, and was awarded a degree in mathematics in 1947. In 1948 while touring South Africa and Rhodesia with a mixed Oxford and Cambridge hockey team he accepted a teaching post at Hilton College, Natal. He moved to Michaelhouse, Natal, then St Martin’s School, Johannesburg, then to a multiracial school at Waterford, Swaziland. He was licensed by the Archbishop of Cape Town as a lay reader.

He returned to England in 1965, where he taught at Epsom College, then (1970–1983) at Uppingham School, Rutland, becoming the head of the Mathematics department in 1980. After retiring in 1983 he taught at the Haberdashers’ Monmouth School for Girls for a year.

He was keen on the operas of Gilbert and Sullivan, and on the history of the Rosevear (also spelled Roseveare or Rosevere) family from Cornwall, England, starting about AD 1500 in the hamlet of Rescorla near Luxulyan. Between 1985 and 1990 Bob published seven booklets on the Roseveare family, which have been updated and reissued as one book, with information on 14,779 descendants throughout the world. His sister Helen Roseveare was a medical missionary in the Congo for 20 years.

He died aged 81 at Uppingham on 8 December 2004.
