= Helen Roseveare =

English Christian missionary, doctor and author

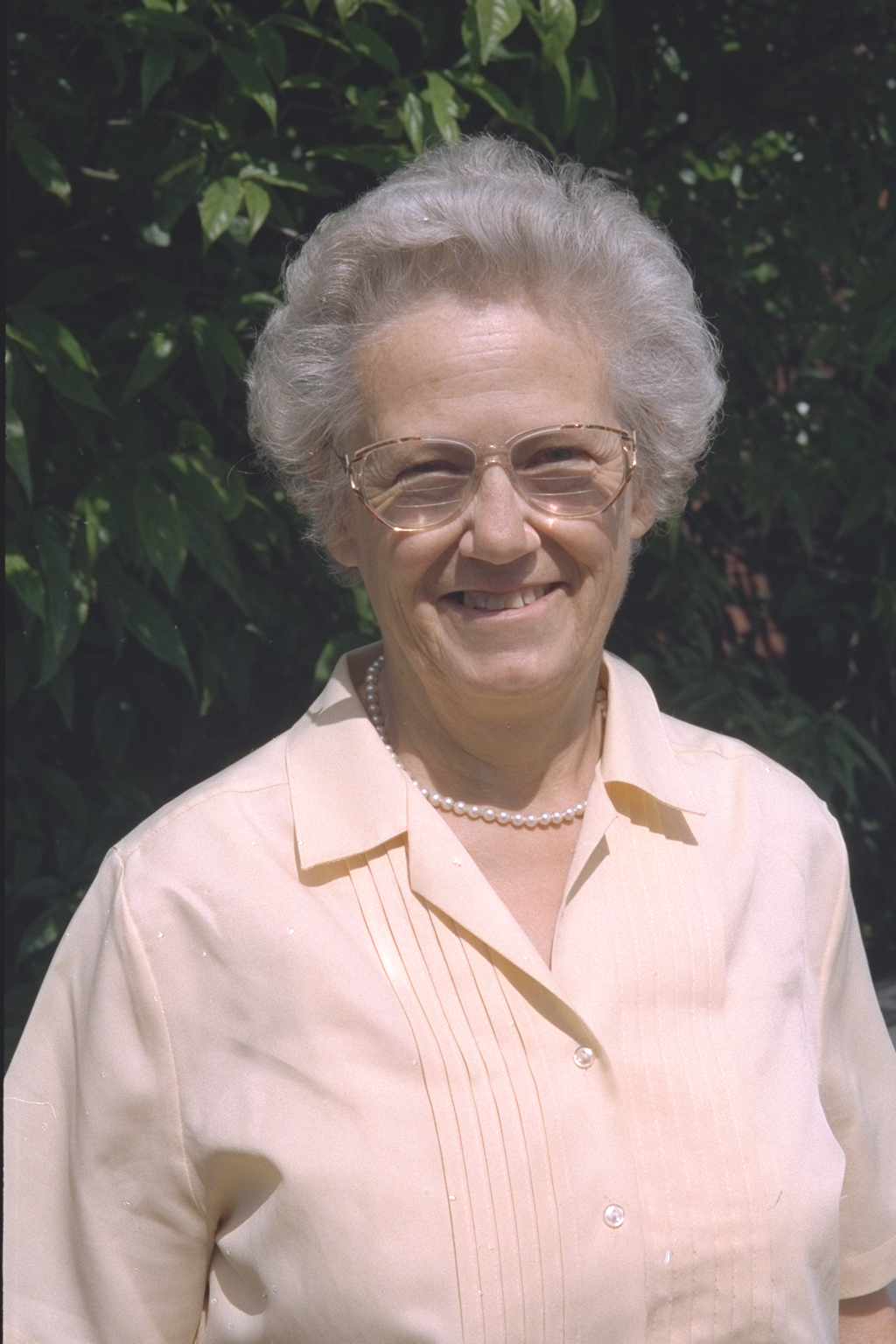
Dr Helen Roseveare at WEC UK HQ in 2003

Helen Roseveare (21 September 1925 – 7 December 2016) was an English Christian missionary, doctor, and author. She worked with Worldwide Evangelization Crusade in the Congo from 1953 to 1973, including part of the period of political instability in the early 1960s. She practiced medicine and also trained others in medical work.

== Biography ==
Helen Roseveare was born in Haileybury College in Hertfordshire, England in 1925. Her father was Martin Roseveare, the designer of ration books for the United Kingdom used during the Second World War. Her brother, Bob Roseveare, was a wartime codebreaker. She became a Christian as a medical student at Newnham College, Cambridge in 1945. She was involved with the Cambridge Inter-Collegiate Christian Union, attending prayer meetings, Bible study classes, and evangelical events.

After completing her studies, Roseveare applied to WEC to be a medical missionary. In 1953, she went to the Congo, where she was assigned to the north-east provinces. She built a combination hospital/ training center in Ibambi in the early 1950s, then relocated to Nebobongo, living in an old leprosy camp, where she built another hospital. After conflict with other staff at the hospital, she returned to England in 1958.

She returned to the Congo in 1960. In 1964 she was taken prisoner by rebel forces, and she remained a prisoner for five months, enduring beatings and rapes. She left the Congo and headed back to England after her release, but returned to the Congo in 1966 to assist in the rebuilding of the nation. She helped establish a new medical school and hospital in Nyankunde, 25 Km south of Bunia, as the other hospitals that she built in Nebobongo had been destroyed. She served there and trained others until she left a thriving medical center in 1973. In 2002, Nyankunde itself was the site of a horrific massacre, when approximately 1000 people were killed and the hospital destroyed. Today, the rebuilt Centre Medical Evangélique Nyankunde Hospital is a lifeline for healthcare, with 150 beds, offering surgical, medical, pediatric, and maternity (30) services. A 13-bed intensive care unit and advanced operating/endoscopy suite were added in 2022.

After her return from Africa, Helen Roseveare had a worldwide ministry speaking and writing. She was a plenary speaker at the Urbana Missions Convention three times. Her life of service was portrayed in the 1989 film Mama Luka Comes Home. Her touching story about the prayer of Ruth, a 10-year-old African girl, for a hot water bottle to save a premature newborn baby after its mother had died has been widely forwarded by email. She survived rape and trial during the Congolese civil war in 1964 because of the intervention of the villagers she had helped previously.

Roseveare died on 7 December 2016 aged 91 in Northern Ireland.

=== Publications ===
- Doctor among Congo Rebels (1965), Lutterworth Press, London
- Give me this Mountain (1966), Christian Focus Publications
- Doctor returns to the Congo (1967), Lutterworth Press, London
- He gave us a Valley (1976), Christian Focus Publications
- Living Sacrifice (1979), Christian Focus Publications
- Living Faith (1980), Christian Focus Publications
- Living Holiness (1986), Christian Focus Publications
- Living Stones (1988), WEC Publications
- On Track: the Girl Crusaders' Union 1915-1990 (1990), Girl Crusaders' Union, London
- Living Fellowship (1992), Hodder & Stoughton
- Digging Ditches (2005), Christian Focus Publications
- Enough (2011), Christian Focus Publications
- Count it All Joy (2017), 10Publishing

== Video ==
- Mama Luka Comes Home original by CTA
- Mama Luka Comes Home Cross.TV
