= List of works by Edward Thomas Daniell =

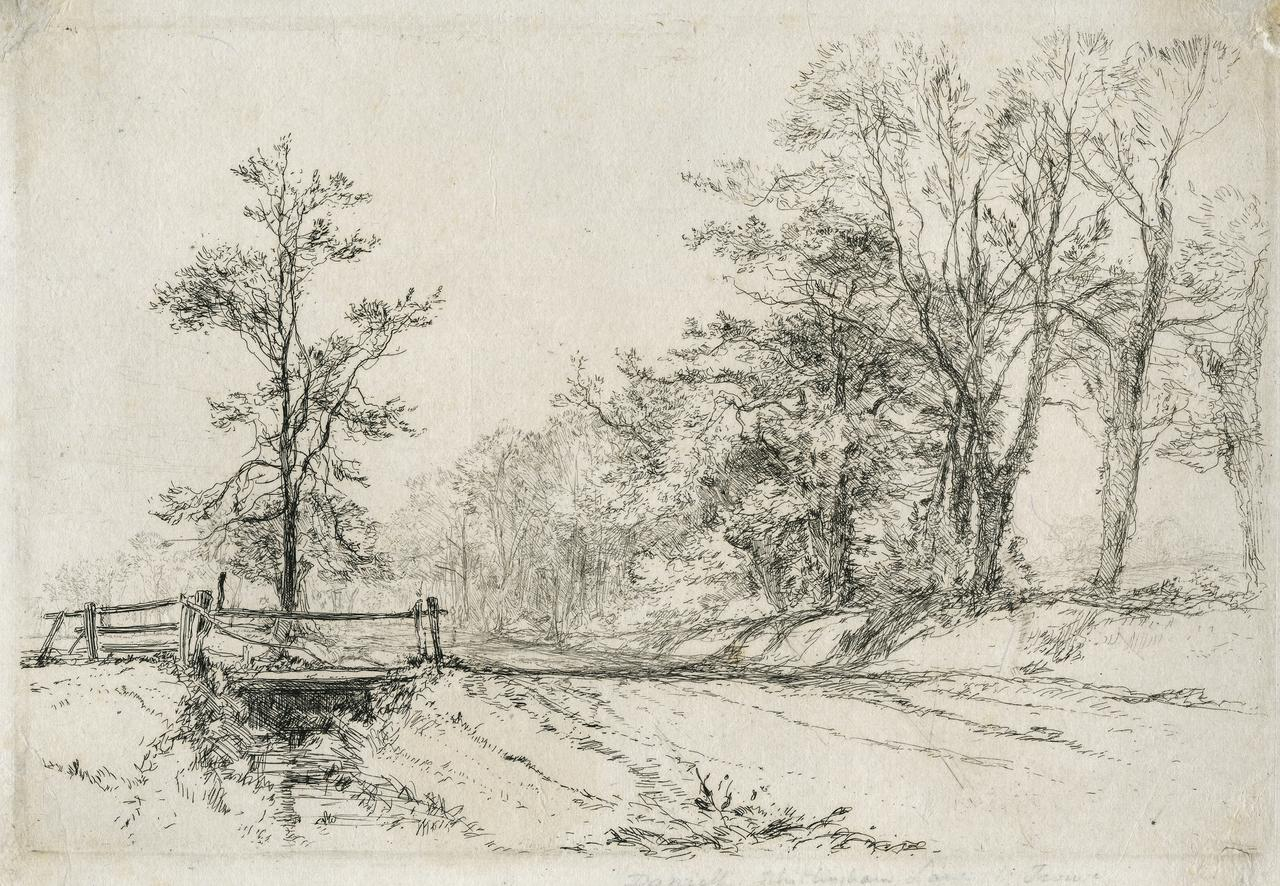
E.T. Daniell - Whitlingham Lane by Trowse (c.1833)

This is an incomplete list of works by Edward Thomas Daniell, an English landscape painter and etcher, best known for drawings made on an expedition to the Middle East and the coast of Lycia. Born in 1804 of wealthy parents, he was brought up in Norwich by his widowed mother. He studied at Balliol College, Oxford, was licensed as the curate at Banham, Norfolk in 1832, and two years later became a curate in London, where he was a patron of the arts. In 1842, whilst on his travels around Lycia, he contracted malaria and died at Antalya.

Daniell exhibited his paintings but was not forced to earn his living from them. His style was influenced by John Crome, J. M. W. Turner and John Sell Cotman. His etchings, of which 52 have been identified, demonstrate his great skill in the use of drypoint,

== Works ==
=== Etchings ===
Key
BM—work held at the British Museum in London
NMC—work held by the Norfolk Museums Collections, based at Norwich Castle
P—included in Inglis Palgrave's Twelve Etchings of the Rev. E. T. Daniell (1882, unpublished, copies in the Victoria & Albert Museum and elsewhere)
O—work held elsewhere.

Image	Title	Date	States	Location(s)	Notes
	Anchor Inn or Bridge House, Aylsham	before 1840		NMC	
	Aqueduct in the Campagna, near Rome	-		NMC	
	At Banham, Norfolk	c.1833	2	NMC	
	Aylsham Bridge, or Bure Bridge (second state)	1827	3	NMC BM V&A	A watercolour of the subject is held at NMC, both previously (and incorrectly, according to the topography)) called Burgh Bridge. The building, known in 1826 as the Anchor Inn, still exists.
	Bridge at Toledo	c.1831	2	NMC	
	Butter Hills, Norwich	c.1826	2	NMC	
	Canal Lock at Oxford (second state)	c.1831/32	2	NMC O	
	Castle Acre	c.1832/33	2	NMC BM	
	Castle of Dunolly, Oban	c.1831	2	NMC	A pure drypoint.
	Castle Ruin on Cliff	c.1831	2	NMC	
	Chalk Pit	c.1827	1		
	Church Tower and Trees *	1824	1	NMC	Probably Daniell's first etching, made with Joseph Stannard, whose very similar work depicts Whitlingham Church and is dated February 1824. Daniell's tower is unfinished.
	Clump of Trees at Quidenham	1833	3	NMC	
	Coast scene	1831	3	NMC	
	Cottage and Trees	1824	3		Apparently the first etching Daniell made on his own, signed and dated February 1824.
	Craigmillar Castle	c.1831	3, 5	NMC BM	small plate and large plates made
	Farmyard near Norwich (View of a road alongside a field)	1833	4	NMC BM	
	Flordon Bridge	1825	3	NMC BM P	The impression of the first state in the British Museum reads "by Edw. Thos. Daniel Esq.,—given to me by him 26 March 1825". Searle describes the work as his early masterpiece that has "an assured individuality which recalls no one else".
	Garden in Spain	c.1831/2	1	NMC BM	
	Grindlewald near Interlaken (second state)	c.1831/32	3	NMC	
	Landscape with Bridge Millgate, Aylsham	c.1827	3	NMC	
	Landscape with Mill	1831	1	NMC	
	Landscape with Oast Houses	c.1831	1	NMC	
	Limekiln (Wooden fence on a hillock)	c.1831	1	NMC BM	
	Milbrook	1824	1	BM	Thistlethwaite describes the plate as a sign of Daniell beginning to move away from the style of his mentor, Joseph Stannard.
	Mountain Scenery - the Matterhorn	c.1831/32	1	NMC	
	Near Norwich	1827	2	NMC	
	Near Norwich - Carrow Snuff Mill in distance	1831	2	NMC	
	Norwich Castle - before the restoration of 1834	c.1834	1	NMC	
	Old Houses	c.1831/32	1	NMC	Thought by Thistlethwaite to have been etched from a drawing sketched during Daniell's tour of Europe.
	Philae Egypt	-		NMC	
	Pollard Trees, Hellesdon	c.1833	1	NMC	
	Ravine with Rocky Scenery	c.1831/32	1	NMC	
	River Scene / River Scene (with bridges)	c.1827	1		
	River Scene with Boathouse	c.1833	2	NMC	
	River Scene with Cottage and Trees	1824	2	NMC	Signed, dated and numbered as Daniell's second etching, this work is in the style of Stannard's Trowse Lane.
	River Scene with Man fishing from a Boat	1824	1	NMC BM	Signed and dated. Possibly misleading documentation suggests this work was modified at a later date by others, including Joseph Stannard.
	Roadside Inn	c.1824	2	NMC	
	Ronda, Andalucia	c.1831/2	3	NMC	
	Roslin Castle	c.1831	2, 1	NMC	small plate and large plate made
	Ruin at Rome	c.1831/32	4	NMC	
	Scene between Trowse and Whitlingham (River landscape at Whitlingham?)	c.1831	1	NMC BM	
	Surlingham Ferry - looking towards Norwich	c.1832	1	NMC	
	Tasburgh Bridge	c.1833	1	NMC	
	The Red Mount Chapel, King's Lynn	c.1831	2	NMC	
	Tower and Bridge, Constance	c.1831/32	2	NMC	
	Trowse Hythe	c.1831	5	NMC	
	Val d'Aosta	c.1831/32	1	NMC BM	
	View of Runham – Broken Rock	c.1831/32	1		
	Waterside Drain – A Study	c.1824	1	NMC	
	Whitlingham Lane by Trowse	c.1833	2	NMC	
	Whitlingham Staithe, Looking towards Norwich	1827	3	NMC BM	

=== Watercolours ===
Key
BM—work held at the British Museum in London
NMC—work held by the Norfolk Museums Collections, based at Norwich Castle
O—work held elsewhere.

Image	Title	Date	Location(s)	Notes
	A Waterfall in Switzerland	-	NMC	
	Aboosimble (Abu Simbel)	-	NMC	
	Abou Righlan, Sinai	-	NMC	
	Acre, Palestine	-	NMC	
	Acropolis of Athens Greece	-	NMC	
	Adalia	-	NMC	
	Aqueduct of Aspendos, in Pamphylia, from the acropolis	-	BM	
	At Merieh 1841	-	NMC	
	Athens from Lycabettus (lethes)	-	NMC	
	Ayun Mousa, Sinai	-	NMC	
	Bellerophon Tomb, Tlos	-	BM	
	Berne Switzerland	-	NMC	
	Bethany, Palestine	-	NMC	
	Bethlehem, Palestine	-	NMC	
	Bettws-y-Coed	-	NMC	
	Beyrout (Beirut)	-	NMC	
	Bozburun, from Selge	-	BM	
	Brick Archway over Stream	-	NMC	
	Bridge at Aylsham	-	NMC	
	Buildings with Footbridge	-	NMC	
	Cairo (from the Citadel)	-	NMC	
	Carnac (Karnak)	-	NMC	
	Composition with castle and bridge	-	NMC	
	Convent of St Saba, Palestine	-	NMC	
	Corfu Greece	-	NMC	
	Corinth Greece	-	NMC	
	Corycian Cave Greece	-	NMC	
	Damascus, Palestine	-	NMC	
	Debod (Debot), Nubia (Sudan)	-	NMC	
	Dendoor (Dendera)	-	NMC	
	Dom Trees near Dendera	-	NMC	
	Edfu	-	NMC	
	El Fatha, Sinai	-	NMC	
	Ermouthis (Ermanthis)	-	NMC	
	Farmyard with Ruined Church in background (Tintern Abbey)	-	NMC	
	Farras (Phthuris), Nubia	-	NMC	
	Figure of a Camel, Wady Tabye Sinai	-	NMC	
	Figures at Corfu Greece	-	NMC	
	First Cataract of the Nile	-	NMC	
no online image	Fortress of Ibreem Nubia	-	NMC	
	From Acro-Corinthus Greece	-	NMC	
	From Elephantine	-	NMC	
	From Luxor	-	NMC	
	From the Summit of Mount St Catherine	-	NMC	
	Front of the Odeum at Cibyra	-	BM	
	Gate to the city of Patara	-	BM	
	Gebal, Sinai	-	NMC	
	Gebelene	-	NMC	
	Gulf of Patrass, Greece	-	NMC	
	Hadgi Ali Pasha going from Damascus to Mecca	-	NMC	
	Havre	-	NMC	
	Helicon from Plata Greece	-	NMC	
no online image	Horeb, Sinai	-	NMC	
	House on a common at sunset	-	BM	
	Howara, supposed to be the bitter waters of Merieh	-	NMC	
	Ibreem Nubia 1841	-	NMC	
	In the Gulf of Mákri	-	BM	
	Interior of a house at Xanthus	-	BM	
	Interior of a Turkish cottage at Pinara	-	BM	
no online image	Interior of Convent, Mount Sinai	-	NMC	
	Jerusalem	-	NMC	
	Jerusalem from a point near the Field of Blood	-	NMC	
	Jerusalem from Olivet	-	NMC	
	Junction of the Mangyr Tschai with Xanthus	-	BM	
	Kalabshee	-	NMC	
no online image	Kalah Abole	-	NMC	
	Kardassy	-	NMC	
	Kobban	-	NMC	
image at Norfolk Museums website	Lake of Thun Switzerland	-	NMC	
	Landscape with castle and bridge	-	NMC	
	Landscape with Trees	-	NMC	
	Larnaca, Cyprus, from the sea	-	BM	
	Lattice Window of an Elizabethan House	-	NMC	
	Luxor	-	NMC	
	Luxor 1841	-	NMC	
	Mákri, the Ancient Telmessus, looking west	-	BM	
	Massicytus Mountains from Pinara	-	BM	
	Massicytus Mountains from Pinara	-	BM	
	Medinet Haboo	-	NMC	
	Monument on the sea side of mount Cragus	-	BM	
	Mount Carmel, Palestine	-	NMC	
	Mount Sinai from the North East	-	NMC	
	Mount Solyma from Deliktash (Olmypus)	-	BM	
	Mount St Catherine, Sinai	-	NMC	
	Mount St Catherine, Sinai	-	NMC	
	Mountain Gorge	-	NMC	
	Mountain Gorge	-	NMC	
	Mountain Sketch in Sinai	-	NMC	
no online image	Mounts Ebal and Gerizim behind Nablous, Palestine	-	NMC	
	Mt. Sinai	-	NMC	
	Myra	-	BM	
	Nablous, Jordan	-	O	
	Nazareth, Jerusalem (Palestine)	-	NMC	
	Near Interlaken, Switzerland	-	NMC	
	Near Kalabshee 1841	-	NMC	
	Pedestal of a monument at Tlos	-	BM	
	Philae	-	NMC	
no online image	Philae from Biggeh	-	NMC	
	Plane Tree Atkos	-	NMC	
	Pools of Solomon, Jerusalem	-	NMC	
	Pyramids	-	NMC	
	Ras Pharaon, Sinai	-	NMC	
	Rhodes from the sea	-	BM	
	River Kishon, Plain of Esdraelon, Palestine	-	NMC	
	River Scene with Bridges	-	NMC	
	River-side Scene	-	NMC	
	Ruins at Athens Greece	-	NMC	
	Ruins at Luxor	-	NMC	
	Ruins of Sura, near Myra	-	BM	
	Ruins of the great wall in the pass below Termessus	-	BM	
	Ruins on the banks of a river	-	BM	
	Sabooa, Nubia	-	NMC	
	Sais 1841	-	NMC	
	Sakara	-	NMC	
	Samaria, Palestine	-	NMC	
	Scene near Alexandria	-	NMC	
	Second Cataract of the Nile	-	NMC	
	Selge, from below the Theatre, looking SW	-	BM	
	Seraidjik	-	BM	
	Sidmouth (formerly known as Isle of Wight)	-	NMC	
	Sidon, Palestine	-	NMC	
	Sillyum in Pamphylia	-	BM	
	Sinai, St Catherine's Convent	-	NMC	
	Sketch of Athens Greece, 1841	-	NMC	
	Source of the River Xanthus	-	BM	
	Stadium and Theatre of Perge, in Pamphylia, from the fortifications	-	BM	
	Stadium of Cibyra	-	BM	
	Suez	-	NMC	
	Summit of Mt. Sinai	-	NMC	
	Syra Greece	-	NMC	
	Teignmouth	-	NMC	
	Temple of Amada near Derr	-	NMC	
	Termessus, looking SE	-	BM	
	The 'Horse' tomb, Xanthus - now in the British Museum	-	BM	
	The Acropolis of Telmessus, looking North East	-	BM	
	The Entrance of the Dart	-	NMC	
	The fire of the 'Chimaera'	-	BM	
	The gorge of the Dembra	-	BM	
	The harbour of Antiphellus, with the Island of Castelorizo	-	BM	
	The Harpy Tomb, Xanthus	-	BM	
	The Islands of Calymnus and Leros	-	BM	
	The Lycian coast with the valley of the Xanthus, from the sea	-	BM	
	The Nile at Feshn	-	NMC	
no online image	The Nile from Ibreem (Ibrim) Nubia	-	NMC	
	The Nile near El Herde	-	NMC	
	The plain and Bay of Phineka	-	BM	
	The remains of an ancient Christian Cathedral, Kassabar	-	BM	
	The Solyma range from the south	-	BM	
	The Rhine at Constance	-	O	
	The Valley of Kassabar from Phellus, looking west	-	BM	
	The valley of the Chimaera, near Olympus	-	BM	
	The Well of Adjerood near Suez	-	NMC	
	Theatre and Stadium of Selge, Pisidia, from the SW	-	BM	
	Theatre at Myra	-	BM	
	Tlos from the NE and the Valley of the Xanthus	-	BM	
	Tlos from the south west	-	BM	
	Tombs in a landscape	-	BM	
	Tschandyr, with ruins, probably of Marmora	-	BM	
no online image	Tyre	-	NMC	
	Valley between Cragus and Anticragus	-	BM	
	Village of Gjombe (Komba)	-	BM	
	Wadee Tafa (Taphis)	-	NMC	
image at Norfolk Museums website	Wady Garondel, Sinai	-	NMC	
	Wady Sheik, Sinai	-	NMC	
	Wady Staff, Sinai	-	NMC	
	Walls near Acre	-	NMC	
	Western Valley, Tombs of the Kings	-	NMC	

=== Other works ===
Key
BM—work held at the British Museum in London
NMC—work held by the Norfolk Museums Collections, based at Norwich Castle.

Image	Title	Medium	Date	Location(s)	Notes
	Self Portrait of Rev. E. T. Daniell	black and white photograph of a painting	-	NMC	no image available
	Garden Scene Fountain and Trees	chalk on paper	-	NMC	
	Lock at Oxford	chalk on paper	-	NMC	
	Mill and Cottages	chalk on paper	-	NMC	no suitable image available
	Roslin (Rosslyn) Castle	chalk on paper	-	BM	
	Ruined Aqueduct in the Campagni di Roma	chalk on paper	-	NMC	no image available
	Steps to Landing Stage	chalk on paper	-	NMC	no suitable image available
	Whitlingham Chalk Pit	chalk on paper	-	NMC	no suitable image available
	Aqueducts on the Frascati 1830	drawing	-	NMC	no image available
	Bonneville	drawing	-	NMC	
	Butcher's Pass from Patrass, Greece. 1840	drawing	-	NMC	no image found
	Distant view of Acalissus and Edebessus	drawing	-	BM	no image available
	Interior of Temple at Derr	drawing	-	NMC	no image available
	Koum Ombos (Kom Ombo)	drawing	-	NMC	no image available
	Near Telegraph Lane, Norwich	drawing	-	NMC	
	One of the Gateways leading to the Grand Temple at Carnac (3 sketches)	drawing	-	NMC	
	Palings and Trees	drawing	-	NMC	
	Part of the Wall of Damascus, Palestine	drawing	-	NMC	
	Portion of Mont Blanc	drawing	-	NMC	
	Quayside Sketch, a fortress	drawing	-	NMC	
	Ruins of the Temple of Hermonthis.	drawing	-	NMC	
	Ruins with church spire in background	drawing	-	NMC	
	Samorus	drawing	-	NMC	
	St. Franciscus near Vico Italy	drawing	-	NMC	
	The valley of Xanthus	drawing	-	BM	
	Turtman Switzerland	drawing	-	NMC	
	Valle de Saxt	drawing	-	NMC	
	Bridge Building	ink	-	NMC	
	Castle of Falaise	ink	-	NMC	
	City of Olympus in Lycia	ink	-	BM	
	Constance	ink	-	NMC	
	Constantinople	ink	-	NMC	
	Delphi, Greece	ink	-	NMC	
	Egyptian Scene	ink	-	NMC	
	Encampment in Sinai	ink	-	NMC	
	Garden Scene in Spain	ink	-	NMC	
	In the vicinity of Delphi Greece (Quari?)	ink	-	NMC	
	Island Sketch	ink	-	NMC	
	Karditsch	ink	-	BM	
	Kos from the Karaboglia Islands	ink	-	BM	
	Landscape with Row-boat	ink	-	NMC	
	Mountain Sketch in Sinai, Sebaste (Sabastiyeh)	ink	-	NMC	
image at NMC	On the Ramparts, Constance (The Rhine at Constance, July 22nd 1830)	ink	-	NMC	
	Orahn, the ancient Araxa	ink	-	BM	
	Palaeocastrizza Greece, 1840	ink	-	NMC	
	Pinara	ink	-	BM	
	Portico of a Turkish house, Kassabar	ink	-	BM	
	Rock tombs at Limyra	ink	-	BM	
	Rock tombs in Lycia	ink	-	BM	
	Ruined Aqueduct above Patrass Greece	ink	-	NMC	
image at Norfolk Museums website	Ruins in Rome	oil	-	NMC	
	Shrine of the Nativity, Bethlehem, Palestine	ink	-	NMC	
	Sketch of Ruins in Rome and map: Verona - Milan - Ravena - Riva - Trent (verso)	ink	-	NMC	
	Summer dwelling in a 'Jaila' or Upland	ink	-	BM	
	The tombs at Telmessus	ink	-	BM	
	The Town of Elmalý	ink	-	BM	
	Thebes	ink	-	NMC	
	Trees with Roadway	ink	-	NMC	
	Valley of the Tay near Dunkeld	ink	-	NMC	
	View of Xanthus	ink	-	BM	
	Village of Armudly on the plain of Phineka	ink	-	BM	
	Wady Faran, Valley on Palms	ink	-	NMC	
	Xanthus from the south, with the Kiosk of Kinik	Pen and brown ink, with graphite on brown paper	-	BM	
	A View of St Malo	oil	-	NMC	
	Back River, Norwich or View at Hellesdon	oil	-	NMC	
	Mount Edgecombe, Devonshire	oil	-	NMC	
	Ruins in Rome	oil	-	NMC	
	Ruins of the Claudian Aqueduct in the Campagna di Roma	oil	-	NMC	
	Sketch for a Picture of the Mountains of Savoy from Geneva	oil	-	NMC	
	Tasburgh and Stratton Meadows	oil	-	NMC	no image available
	Mount Gerizim, Nablous, Palestine	sepia	-	NMC	
	Schaffhausen	sepia	-	NMC	no image available

== Sources ==
- Thistlethwaite, Jane (1974). "The etchings of E.T. Daniell". Norfolk Archaeology. 36 (1). Norwich: 1–22. doi:10.5284/1078074. OCLC 1979600.
- Searle, Geoffrey R. (2015). Etchings of the Norwich School. Norwich: Lasse Press. ISBN 978-0-95687-589-1.

== Further information ==
- Binyon, Laurence (1900). Catalogue of drawings by British artists and artist of foreign origin working in Great Britain. Vol. 2. London: Longmans & Co. OCLC 1041783494.
- Daniell, Edward Thomas; Palgrave, Robert Harry Inglis (1882). Twelve etchings by the Reverend E.T. Daniell with a short notice of his life by R.H. Inglis Palgrave. Great Yarmouth. OCLC 558920940.
