= Stannard =

Stannard is a surname. Notable people with the surname include:

- David Stannard (born 1941), American historian
- Eliot Stannard (1888-1944), British screenwriter
- George J. Stannard, Union general in the American Civil War
- Ian Stannard, English cyclist
- James Stannard, Australian former rugby union footballer
- Lynn Stannard, Manitoba judge
- Richard Stannard (songwriter), English songwriter and record producer
- Richard Stannard (triathlete), British triathlete
- Richard Been Stannard, English recipient of the Victoria Cross
- Russell Stannard, English physicist
- a British family of painters
  - Alfred Stannard
  - Alfred George Stannard
  - Eloise Harriet Stannard
  - Emily Coppin Stannard
  - Joseph Stannard
- a British family of painters (2)
  - Emily Stannard
  - Henry Sylvester Stannard
  - Lilian Stannard

== See also ==
- Ray Stannard Baker, American journalist and author
- Stannard Township, Michigan
- Stannard, Vermont
- Stannard Beach, a section of Westbrook, Connecticut
- Stannards, New York
