= Emily Stannard =

British painter (1802–1885)

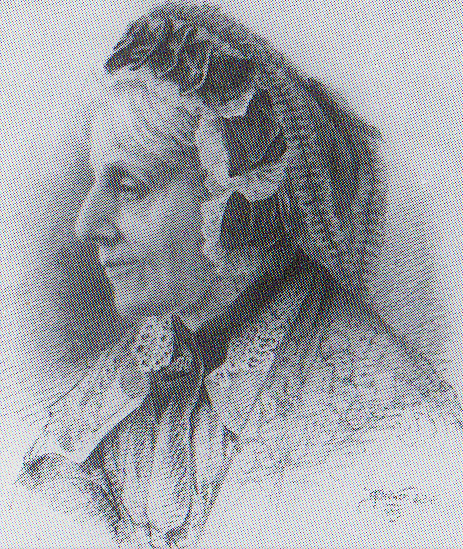
- Portrait of Mrs Joseph Stannard (1830–1885) drawn c.1885 by Julian Cedric Brewer
- Born: 8 February 1802; Norwich, England
- Died: 6 January 1885 (aged 82); Norwich, England
- Known for: still life painting
- Movement: Norwich School of painters
- Spouse: Joseph Stannard

Emily Stannard (née Emily Coppin; 8 February 1802 – 6 January 1885), who from 1826 called herself (even during her long widowhood) Mrs Joseph Stannard, was a British still life painter. She was associated with the Norwich School of painters, Britain's first provincial art movement. Along with her niece Eloise Harriet Stannard, she is considered to be the most accomplished British female still life artist of the 19th century.

Stannard was born in Norwich of artistic parents. In 1820, she travelled with her father Daniel Coppin to the Netherlands to study the paintings of Jan van Huysum and other Dutch masters, an episode which influenced her artistic style. She married the Norwich artist Joseph Stannard in 1826, but was widowed four years later. She painted until she was in her eighties, mainly depicting paintings of flowers in vases, fruit or game animals. She exhibited in both Norwich and London, and was awarded a large gold medal in 1820 for an original painting of flowers, and two further gold medals in later years. She became an honorary member of the Norwich Society of Artists in 1831. Her works were favourably received by the local press during her lifetime, and in recent decades, art historians have praised the highly finished appearance of her paintings and her use of colour.

The largest collection of works by Stannard are held by the Norfolk Museums Collections, based at Norwich Castle. Her works were shown at an exhibition of paintings by her family held in Norwich in 1934, and she was among those women artists featured in 2018 and 2019, at the exhibition Visible Women at Norwich Castle.

== Background ==
Stannard is associated with the Norwich School of painters, which was, according to the art historian Andrew Moore, "a unique phenomenon in the history of 19th-century British art." Norwich was the first English city outside London where a school of artists arose. Its most important members were John Crome and John Sell Cotman—the leading spirits and finest artists of the movement—as well as Joseph Stannard, James Stark, George Vincent, Robert Ladbrooke and Edward Thomas Daniell, the best etcher of the school. The Norwich School artists were connected by geographical location, their depiction of Norwich and rural Norfolk, and by close personal and professional relationships. (Note: The Stannards were the most conspicuous family of still-life painters in nineteenth century England. Alfred Stannard and his older brother Joseph specialised in painting landscapes and marine art, but with the encouragement of Emily Stannard included still-life works in their repertoire. Her niece Eloise Harriet Stannard in turn became a prominent painter flowers and fruit.) By the end of the 19th century their paintings, which had once been regarded as modern and progressive, were seen as belonging to a bygone age, a view that Andrew Hemingway has attributed to the "mythology of rural Englishness" that prevailed at the start of the 20th century.

The Norwich Society of Artists was founded in 1803. Members of the Stannard family showed their pictures at the Society's exhibitions, but they had few other artistic connections with their Norwich contemporaries. Emily Stannard became an honorary member in 1831, and was the only individual in her family to have a formal association with the Society.

== Life ==
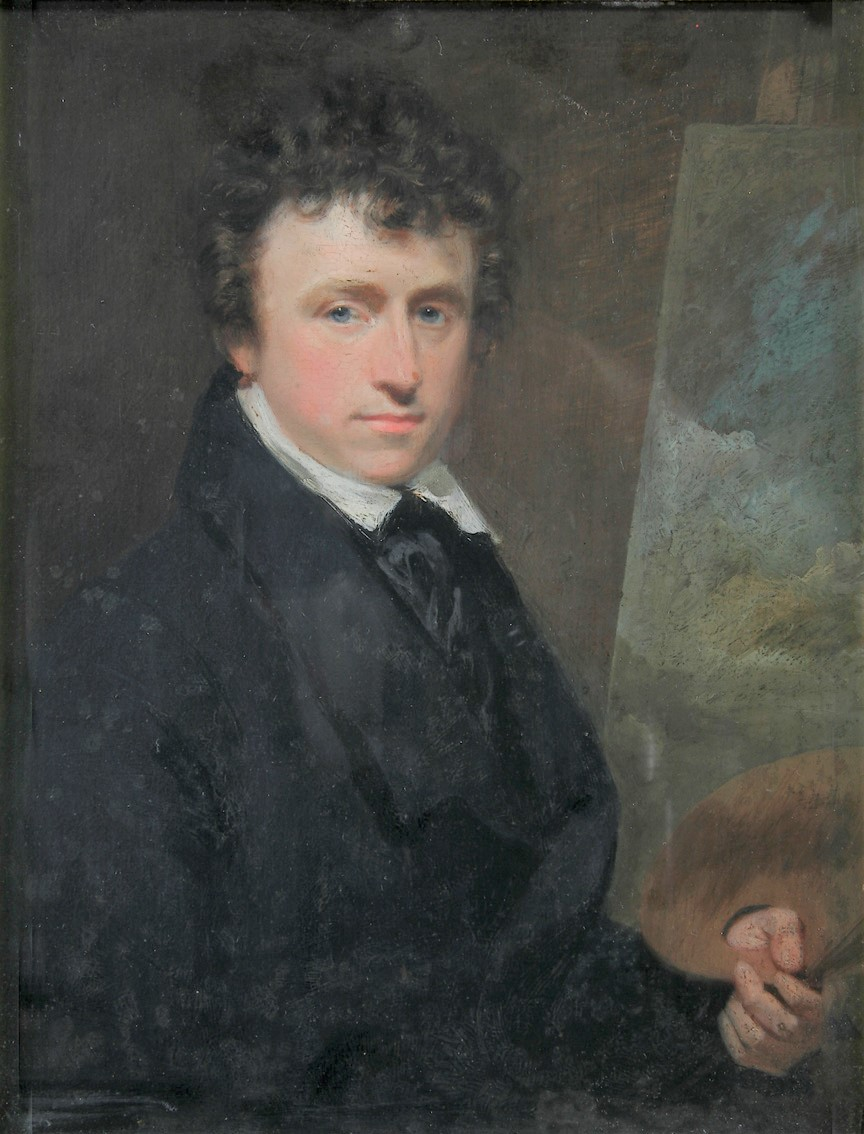
Joseph Stannard

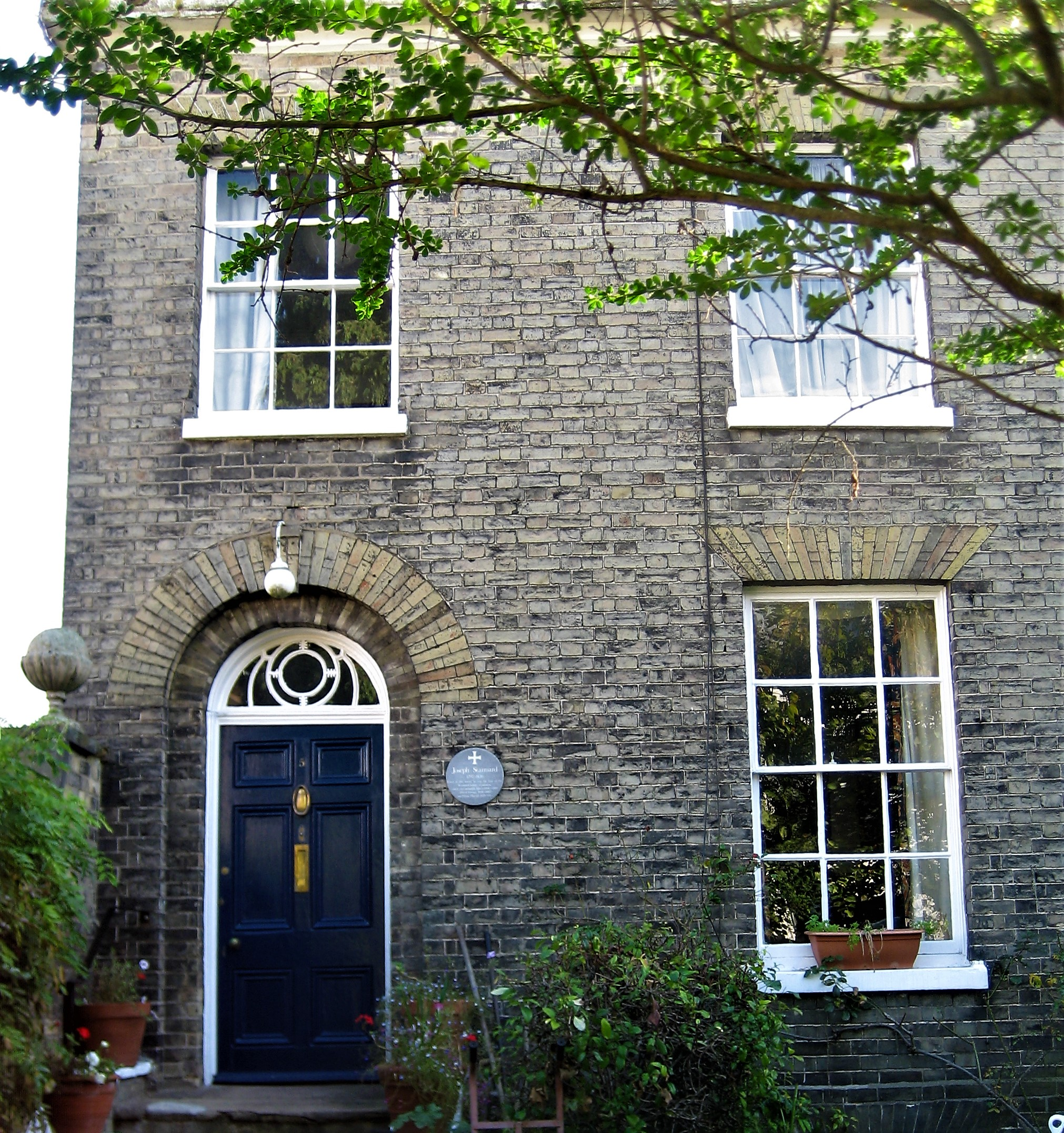
The Stannard's home at 5, St. Giles Terrace, Norwich

Emily Coppin was born on 8 February 1802 in Norwich, the daughter of Daniel Coppin and his wife Elizabeth Clyatt. Both her parents were accomplished amateur artists. Daniel Coppin was a collector and a founding member of the Norwich Society of Artists. Elizabeth Coppin was a talented copyist who was twice honoured with a medal by the Norwich Society. Little is known of Coppin's childhood or education. In 1820, she travelled with her father to Holland to study Dutch painting, which greatly influenced her subsequent work. During her visit, she obtained permission to copy paintings by the Dutch Master Jan van Huysum at Trippon House, Amsterdam, and her work was praised for its accuracy. There, according to her obituary, "she complied with the conditions laid down by showing two specimens of her painting, the President of the Amsterdam Gallery, Mons. Apostal, expressing great satisfaction with her work, and she was allowed to make a copy of another Van Huysum".

Coppin met and got to know her fellow artist Joseph Stannard in 1820 when attending meetings of the Norwich Society of Artists, On 3 January 1826, with Emily already an established artist who had exhibited works, they were married at St George's, Tombland in Norwich. They were a well-matched couple, with both coming from artistic backgrounds. Their daughter Emily was born in 1827. Their second child Harriet Augusta died in March 1830, aged nine months. The marriage was short-lived, for Joseph Stannard died of tuberculosis in 1830 at the age of thirty-three, despite the efforts of his wife, who tried many doctors and treatments in an attempt to save him. She was to outlive him by over half a century.

Their daughter Emily was a still life painter and a teacher, who exhibited with the Norfolk and Norwich Association in 1856 and the Norwich Industrial Exhibition in 1867. Their niece Eloise Harriet Stannard and Eloise's younger brother Alfred George Stannard were both notable artists, as was Joseph's brother Alfred Stannard. Stannard lived as an artist and a teacher in Norwich for over 50 years, during which time her paintings received favourable reviews in the press.

Stannard had a studio in the city in Rose Lane. During her last years she lived at 12 Cathedral Street with her unmarried daughter Emily, and died there on 6 January 1885.

== Career ==
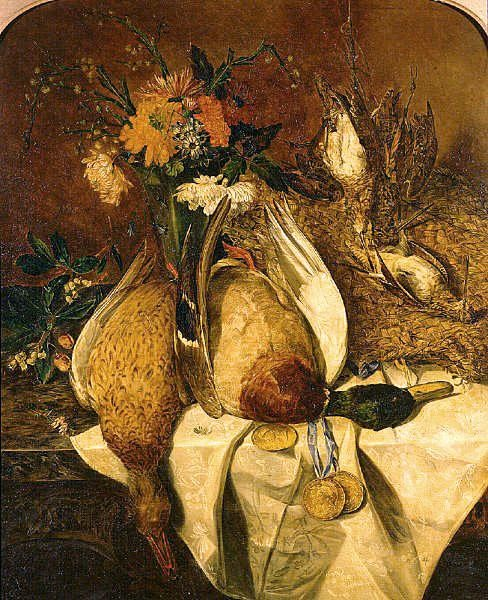
Still Life with Mallard Snipes and Gold Medals

Stannard's early paintings were influenced by the Dutch masters; both her representation of vases and the finish of her depiction of flowers owed much to Huysum, and her unsigned works were sometimes attributed to 18th century Dutch painters. Her Still life: Dead Ducks and a Hare with a Basket and Sprig of Holly reveals a debt to Jan Weenix, whose work Dead Hare and Partidges was presumably seen by her when it was exhibited at the British Institution. Paintings by Dutch masters at country houses in Norfolk (such as at Wolterton Hall) may also have been available for her to view. Stannard, assisted by her daughter, had a long career as an art teacher.

During Stannard's artistic career, which continued until shortly before her death, she depicted flower bouquets in vases and other traditional still life paintings of tableware, fruit or game animals, in front of plain backgrounds. She first exhibited her works in 1816. In 1821, aged 17, she was awarded the Norwich Society of Artists' gold medal for one of her paintings of flowers. By 1824 she has established her eminence as a still life artist. In 1822 she won a second medal for a still life of a collection of fruit, and a third medal in 1828 for a painting of game animals, which was exhibited at the Norwich Society of Artists as Dead Game from Nature. She exhibited 22 pictures at the Norwich Society of Artists from 1816 to 1825. Her paintings were shown at the Norfolk and Suffolk Institution, the Norwich & Norfolk Art Union, the Norwich & Norfolk Association, the Norwich Art Loan Exhibitions, and the Norwich Fine Art Association. Although she usually exhibited her work in Norwich, from 1823 to 1825 she showed paintings at the Royal Society of British Artists the British Institution in London.

On least one occasion Stannard signed a painting 'Emily Stannard', but her works are more usually signed 'Mrs. Joseph Stannard'. Her canvasses, which were often left unvarnished, were consistently painted with a thin, diluted paint, in a similar way to the works of the Dutch masters she studied.

== Recognition ==
Stannard received good local press reviews of her works throughout her career. In 1823 the Norwich Mercury wrote of her that "she is an honour to art, an honour to the city, and an honour to her sex, by the taste, industry, and knowledge, her beautifully disposed and elaborately finished pictures display." Her obituary appeared in the local press the week following her death, mentioning that "Mrs. Stannard had a great artistic merit, was a very clever painter of fruit, flowers, fish, game, and still life, and her pictures have always been highly esteemed by lovers of art", and describing "her kindly, gentle, modest, and simple nature (which) endeared her to all who had the pleasure of her acquaintance". (Note: Emily Stannard's full obituary in The Norfolk Chronicle read: "We regret to announce the somewhat sudden death of a charming old lady, Mrs. Joseph Stannard, of 12, Cathedral-street, in this city, on Tuesday, the 6th inst. Mrs Joseph Stannard, née Coppin, was one of the last remaining links of the old Norwich School of Artists. She was the widow of the well-known and excellent artist, Joseph Stannard, who died in 1830, at the early age of 34 years, in the prime of life, and while rapidly and steadily advancing in power and fame. Mrs. Stannard had a great artistic merit, was a very clever painter of fruit, flowers, fish, game, and still life, and her pictures have always been highly esteemed by lovers of art. In 1820 she received the large gold medal from the Society of Arts for an original painting of flowers. In August of the same year she went with her father to Holland, where in the Hague Gallery she made truthful copies of two precious small fruit pictures. At Trippon House, Amsterdam, she obtained permission to reproduce the celebrated Flower Pictures by Van Huysum. Her copies were greatly praised by celebrated foreign connoisseurs of the day for their close similitude of the originals. At Amsterdam she complied with the conditions laid down by showing two specimens of her painting, the President of the Amsterdam Gallery, Mons. Apostal, expressing great satisfaction with her work, and she was allowed to make a copy of another Van Huysum. In 1821 she was presented with the large gold medal of the Society of Arts, London, for an original painting of fruit. In 1828, as Mrs. Joseph Stannard, she received the gold medal for an original painting of game. As late as 1870 she exhibited in an exhibition at Norwich two very pictures of flowers and song birds, elaborately and beautifully painted, both of them brilliant and effective, which were very highly spoken of in the local journals at the time. Her kindly, gentle, modest, and simple nature endeared her to all who had the pleasure of her acquaintance, by whom she will ever be remembered with great esteem, regard, and affection. Many of the last years of her life were smoothed and cheered by the loving care and companionship of an only daughter, to whom we tender our sincere sympathy".)

Emily Stannard and her niece Eloise Harriet Stannard are nowadays considered to be among the most accomplished British women still life painters of the 19th century. According to the art historian and author Josephine Walpole, the quality of Stannard's flower paintings display a "natural talent" and "impeccable colour sense". The historian Derek Clifford noted that she “did not appear to have been an inventive artist”, but added that he thought she deserved fame. According to Moore, Stannard's technique strengthened to become highly finished in the years after her husband's and became typically “less mannered” in the 1840s and 1850s; her only rivals were the Norwich born James Sillett, and his daughter Emma.

The Norfolk Museums Collections is the only United Kingdom public art collection which possesses works by Stannard. Her paintings there are: Still life: hamper with dead wood pigeon and leveret; Still life: dead ducks and a hare with a basket and a sprig of holly (1853); Still life with dead game and a flagon and a string of onions (1847); Dead game and a gun (1835); Dead game (1837); Flowers; Still life: group of dead game birds; and Wild duck (study).

Stannard's works were shown at the Norwich Castle Museum Stannard Exhibition in 1934. She was among those women artists represented at the exhibition Visible Women at Norwich Castle in 2018 and 2019.

== Gallery ==
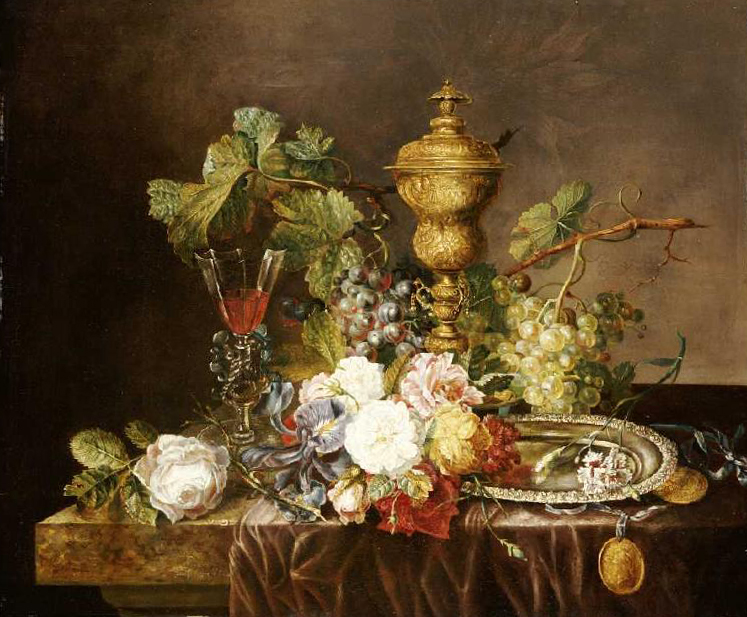
Floral still life with a silver-gilt cup (1824)

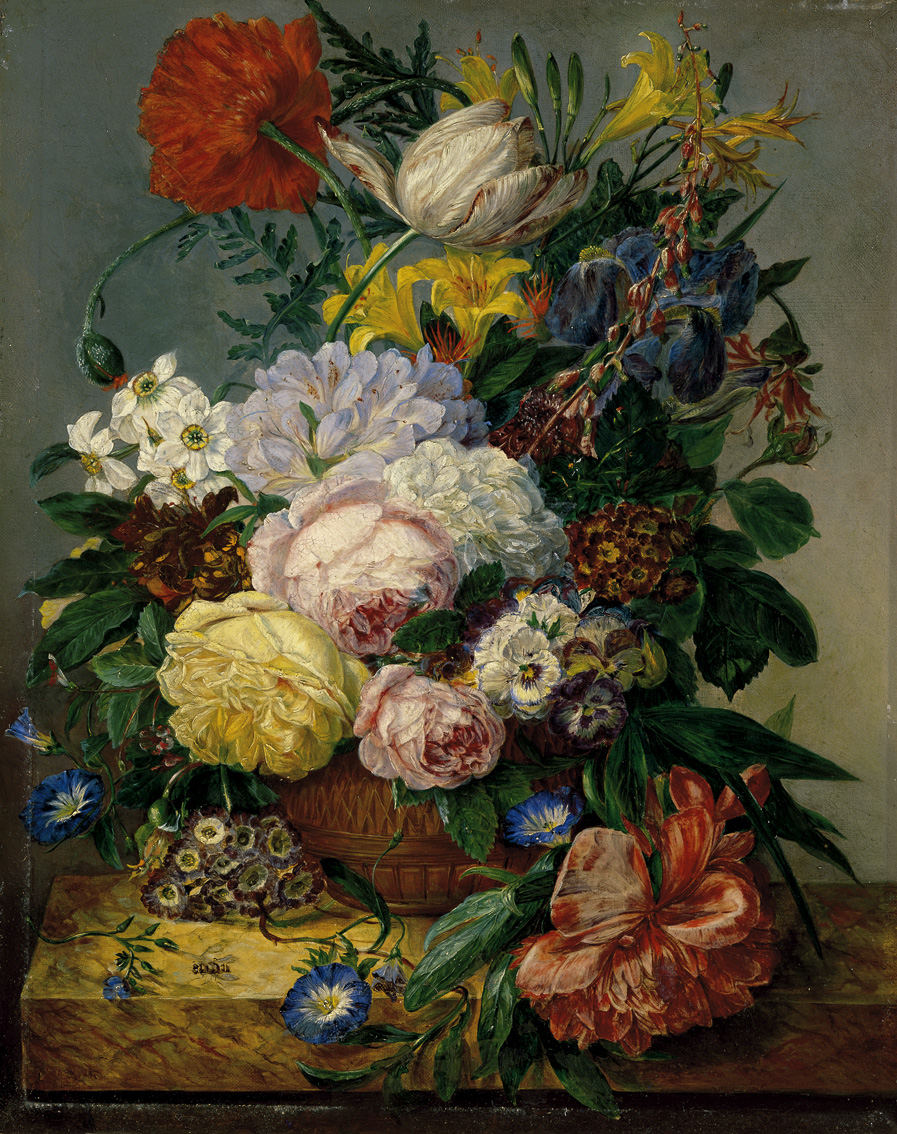
Flowers (1840s), Norfolk Museums Collections

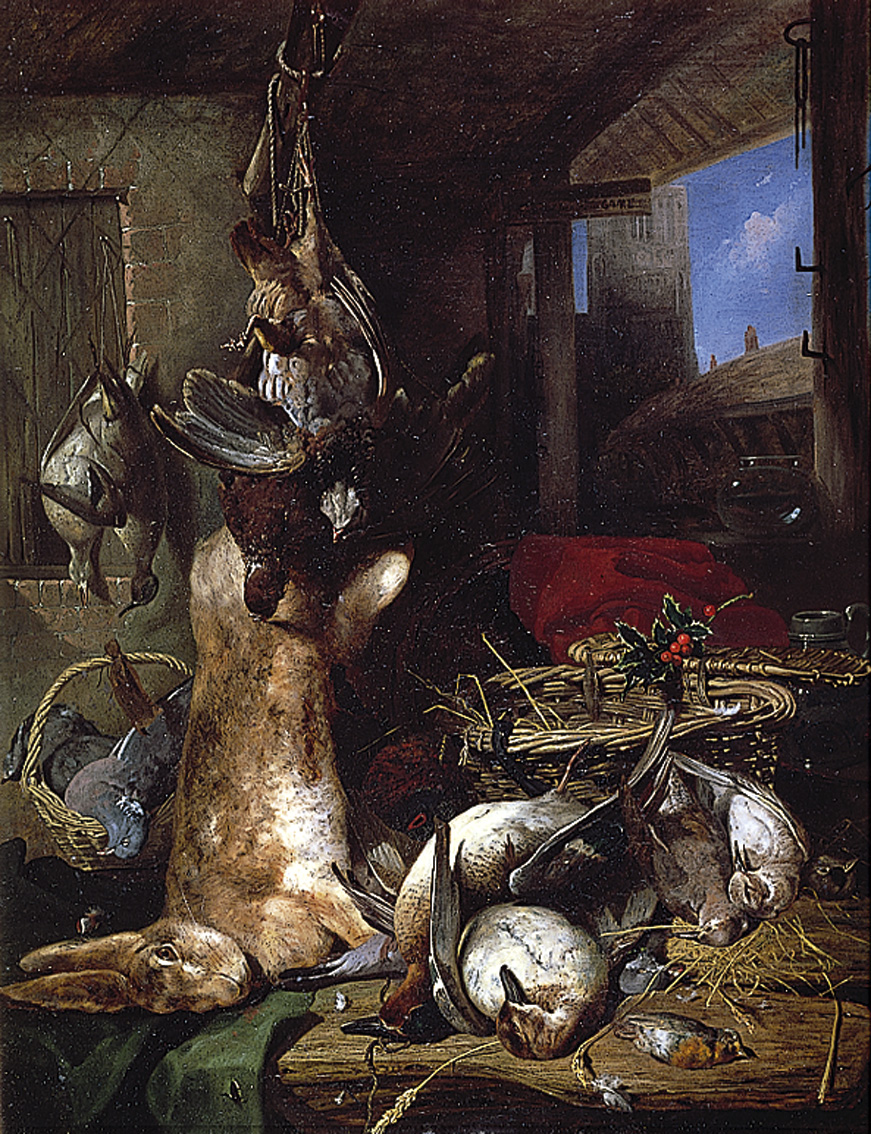
Still Life: Dead ducks and a hare with a basket and a sprig of holly (1853), Norfolk Museums Collections

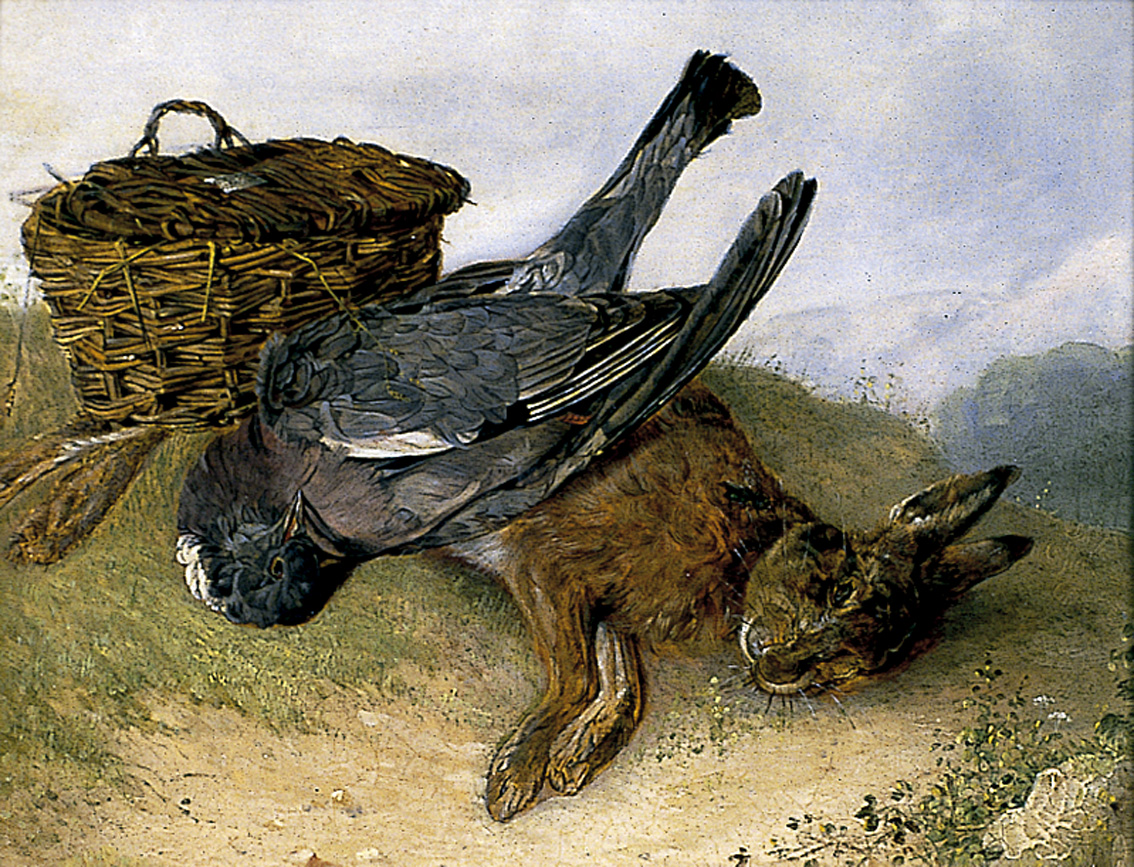
Still Life: Hamper with dead wood pigeon and leveret (undated), Norfolk Museums Collections

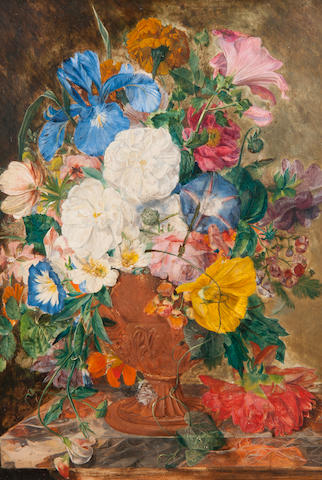
Still life of flowers and butterfly in a terracotta vase (undated)

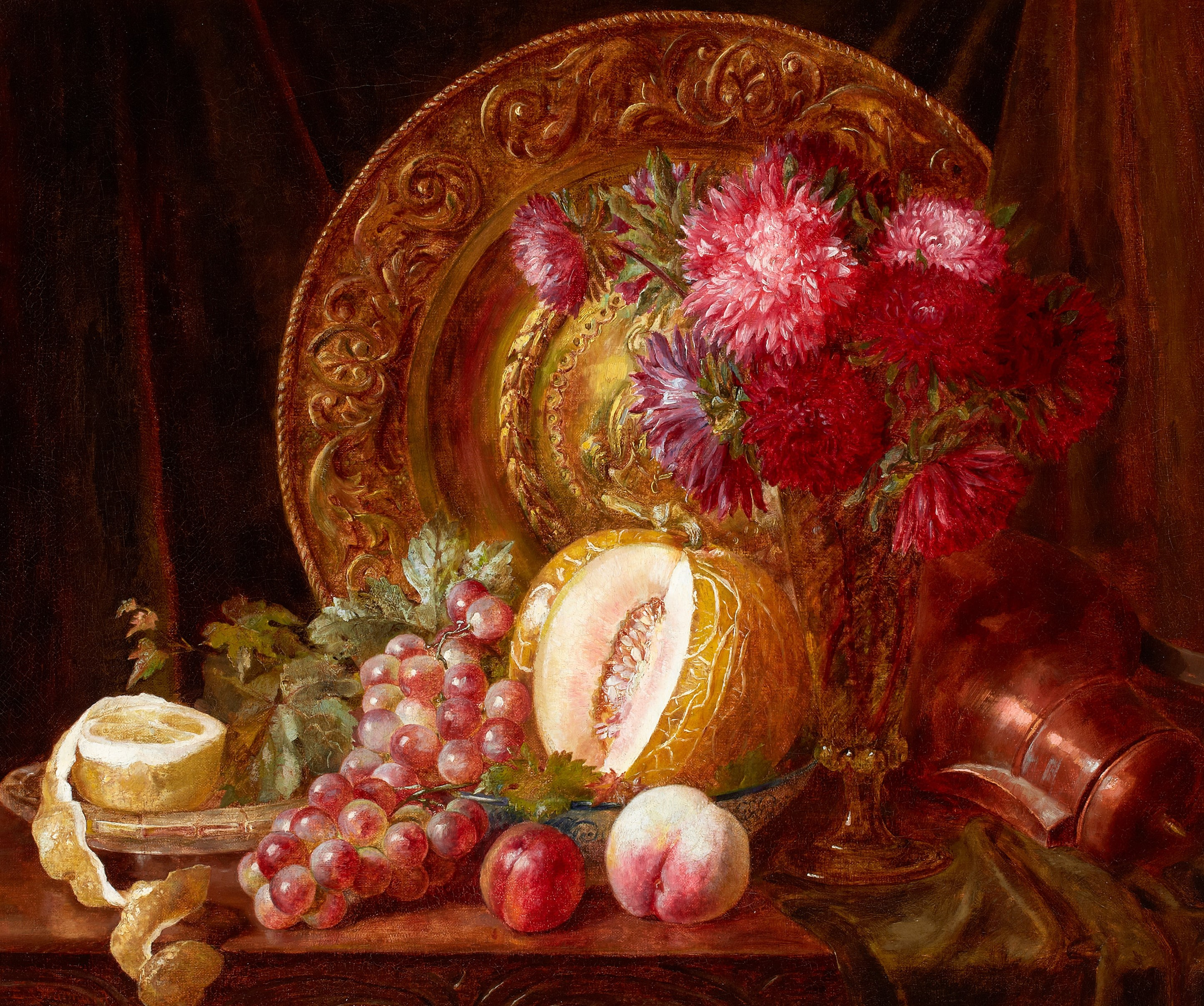
Chrysanthemums, fruits and plate (undated)

== Bibliography ==
- Burbidge, Robert Brinsley (1974). A Dictionary of British Flower, Fruit, and Still Life Painters. Vol. 1. Leigh-on-Sea: F. Lewis. ISBN 9-780-85317-024-2.
- Clifford, Derek Plint (1965). Watercolours of the Norwich School. London: Cory, Adams & Mackay. OCLC 1624701.
- Cundall, Herbert Minton (1920). Holme, Geoffrey (ed.). The Norwich School. London: Geoffrey Holme Ltd. OCLC 651802612.
- Day, Harold A. E. (1966). Life and Work of Joseph Stannard 1797–1830. Eastbourne: Eastbourne Fine Art. OCLC 1113261992.
- Day, Harold (1969). The Norwich School of Painters. Eastbourne: Eastbourne Fine Art. ISBN 978-0-902010-10-9.
- Dickes, William Frederick (1905). The Norwich School of Painting: being a full account of the Norwich exhibitions, the lives of the painters, the lists of their respective exhibits and descriptions of the pictures. Norwich: Jarrold & Sons Ltd. OCLC 558218061.
- Gray, Sara (2009). The Dictionary of British Women Artists. Cambridge: Lutterworth Press. ISBN 9-781-78684-235-0.
- Hemingway, Andrew (1988). "Cultural Philanthropy and the Invention of the Norwich School". Oxford Art Journal. 11 (2): 17–39. doi:10.1093/oxartj/11.2.17. ISSN 0142-6540.
- Mackie, Charles (1901). Norfolk Annals: A Chronological Record of Remarkable Events in the Nineteenth Century. Vol. 2. Oxford: Norfolk Chronicle. ISBN 978-0-7148-2001-9.
- Mitchell, Peter (1973). Great Flower Painters: four centuries of floral art. Woodstock, New York: The Overlook Press. ISBN 978-0-87951-008-4.
- Moore, Andrew W. (1988). Dutch and Flemish Painting in Norfolk: A history of taste and influence, fashion and collecting. London: Her Majesty's Stationery Office. ISBN 978-0-11-701061-1.
- Moore, Andrew W. (1985). The Norwich School of Artists. Norwich: Her Majesty's Stationery Office/Norwich Museums Service. ISBN 978-0-11-701587-6.
- Nunn, Pamela Gerrish (1995). Problem Pictures: Women and men in Victorian painting. Scholar Press. ISBN 978-1-85928-152-9.
- Rajnai, Miklos; Stevens, Mary (1976). The Norwich Society of Artists, 1805–1833: a dictionary of contributors and their work. Norwich: Norfolk Museums Service for the Paul Mellon Centre for Studies in British Art. ISBN 978-0-903101-29-5.
- Vincent, Adrian (1992). A Companion to Victorian and Edwardian Artists. David & Charles. ISBN 978-1-85149-261-9.
- Walpole, Josephine (1997). Art and Artists of the Norwich School. Woodbridge: Antique Collectors' Club. ISBN 978-1-85149-261-9.
- Wright, Christopher; Gordon, Catherine (2006). British and Irish Paintings in Public Collections: an index of British and Irish oil paintings by artists born before 1870 in public and institutional collections in the United Kingdom and Ireland. New Haven: Yale University Press. pp. 790–791. ISBN 978-0-300-11730-1.
- The Report of the Castle Museum Committee to the Town Council. Norwich: Edward Burgess. 1894.
- "Transactions of the Society, Instituted at London for the Encouragement of Arts, Manufactures and Commerce". RSA Journal. 39 (2 ed.). London: Dodsley, Lockyer. 1821. ISSN 0958-0433.
