= Stanard =

Stanard is a surname, and occasionally a given name.

== Surname ==
Notable people with the surname include:

- Edwin Obed Stanard (1832–1914), American politician from Missouri
- Jaqueline Beverly Stanard (1845–1864), American Civil War soldier
- Jon Stanard, American politician
- Mary Newton Stanard (1865–1929) American historian
- Robert Stanard (1781–1846), American lawyer, judge and politician from Virginia
- Steve Stanard, American football coach
- Willie Stanard (1867–1936), American baseball player

== Given name ==
Notable people with the given name include:

- Stan Ridgway (1954–), American musician

== See also ==
- Stannard, a similar surname
