= Edwin Cooper =

Edwin Cooper may refer to:

- Edwin Cooper (actor) (1894–1984), American actor
- Edwin Cooper (architect) (1874–1942), English architect
- Edwin Cooper (artist) (1785–1833), English artist
- Eddie Cooper (cricketer) (1915–1968), English cricketer
