= Frederick Ladbrooke =

English painter (1810–1865)

- Born: 26 November 1810; Norwich, England
- Died: 1865; Bury St. Edmunds, England
- Known for: Landscape painting
- Movement: Norwich School of painters

Frederick Ladbrooke (1810–1865) was an English painter of landscapes and a member of the Norwich School of painters.

== Life ==
Ladbrooke was born 26 November 1810, the son of Robert Ladbrooke and his wife Ann Dorey (née Bly), and was baptised at St John the Baptist's Church, Timberhill, Norwich on 2 December.

He was born into a family of artists, by whom he probably received his training. He was an exhibitor at the Norwich Society of Artists, specialising in depicting rural landscapes. He lived for most of his life in Bury St. Edmunds, Suffolk.

== Bibliography ==
- Walpole, Josephine (1997). Art and Artists of the Norwich School. Woodbridge: Antique Collectors' Club. ISBN 1-85149-261-5.
