= Horace Beevor Love =

English painter

Horatio Beevor Love
- Born: 7 December 1800
- Died: 13 August 1838 (aged 37)
- Known for: Portrait painting
- Movement: associated with the Norwich School of painters

Horatio (also, incorrectly Horace) Beevor Love (7 December 1800 – 13 August 1838) was an English portrait painter who exhibited with the Norwich School of painters.

== Life ==
Horatio Beevor Love was born on 7 December 1800, a twin son of Samuel Love and his wife Lydia, and was baptised at the Old Meeting House Congregational Church, Norwich, on 8 January 1801.

He painted and exhibited portraits, landscapes and miniatures, and depicted the portraits of several contemporary members of the Norwich School of painters, including John Sell Cotman.

He also painted a number of the faces in works by Edwin Cooper (1785-1833), some of which are credited.

He became a Freeman of the City of Norwich on 18 December 1824 with admission as the son of a Freeman and trade of Miniature Painter.

He married Mary Ann Tovell on 19 April 1824 in Norwich and they had six children.

== Bibliography ==
- Walpole, Josephine (1997). Art and Artists of the Norwich School. Woodbridge: Antique Collectors' Club. ISBN 1-85149-261-5.
