= Samuel David Colkett =

English painter

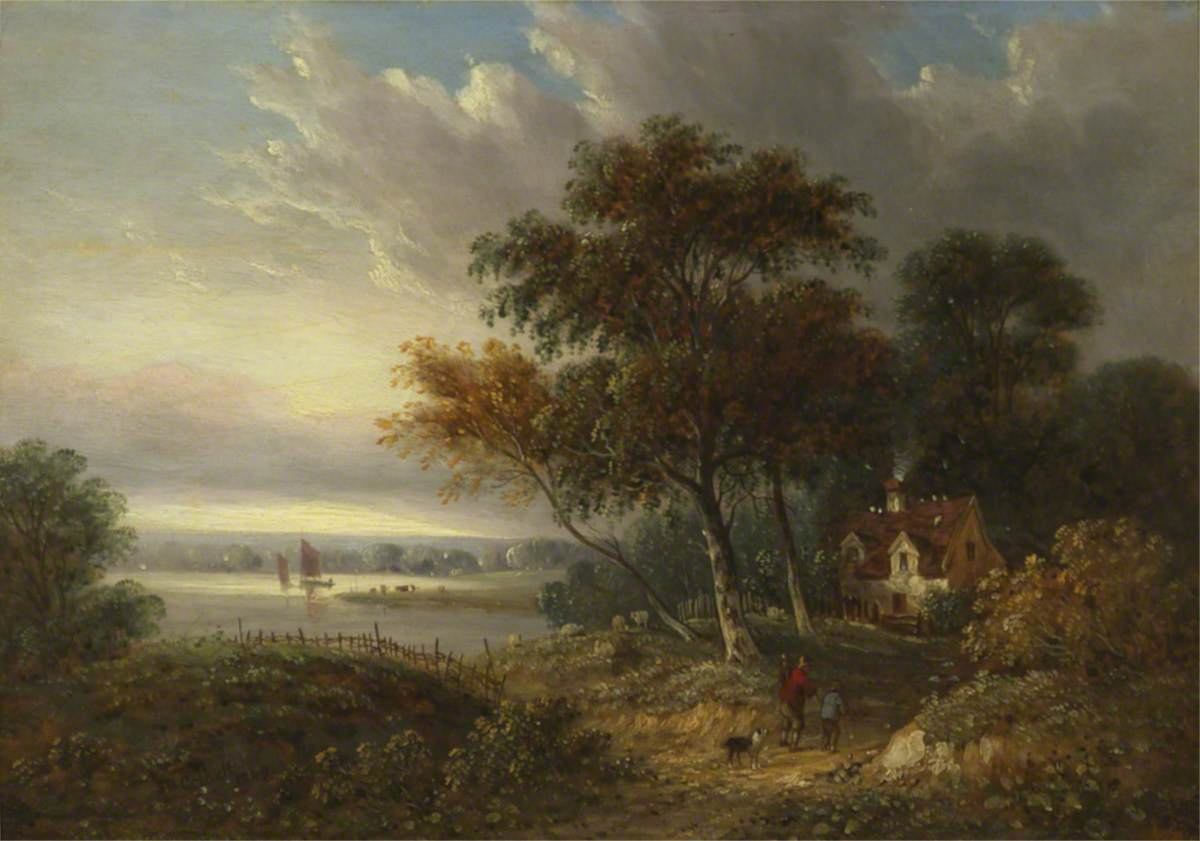
- Landscape with Cottage (1842)
- Born: 1806; Norwich
- Died: 24 January 1863 (aged 56–57); Cambridge
- Known for: Landscape painting
- Movement: Norwich School of painters

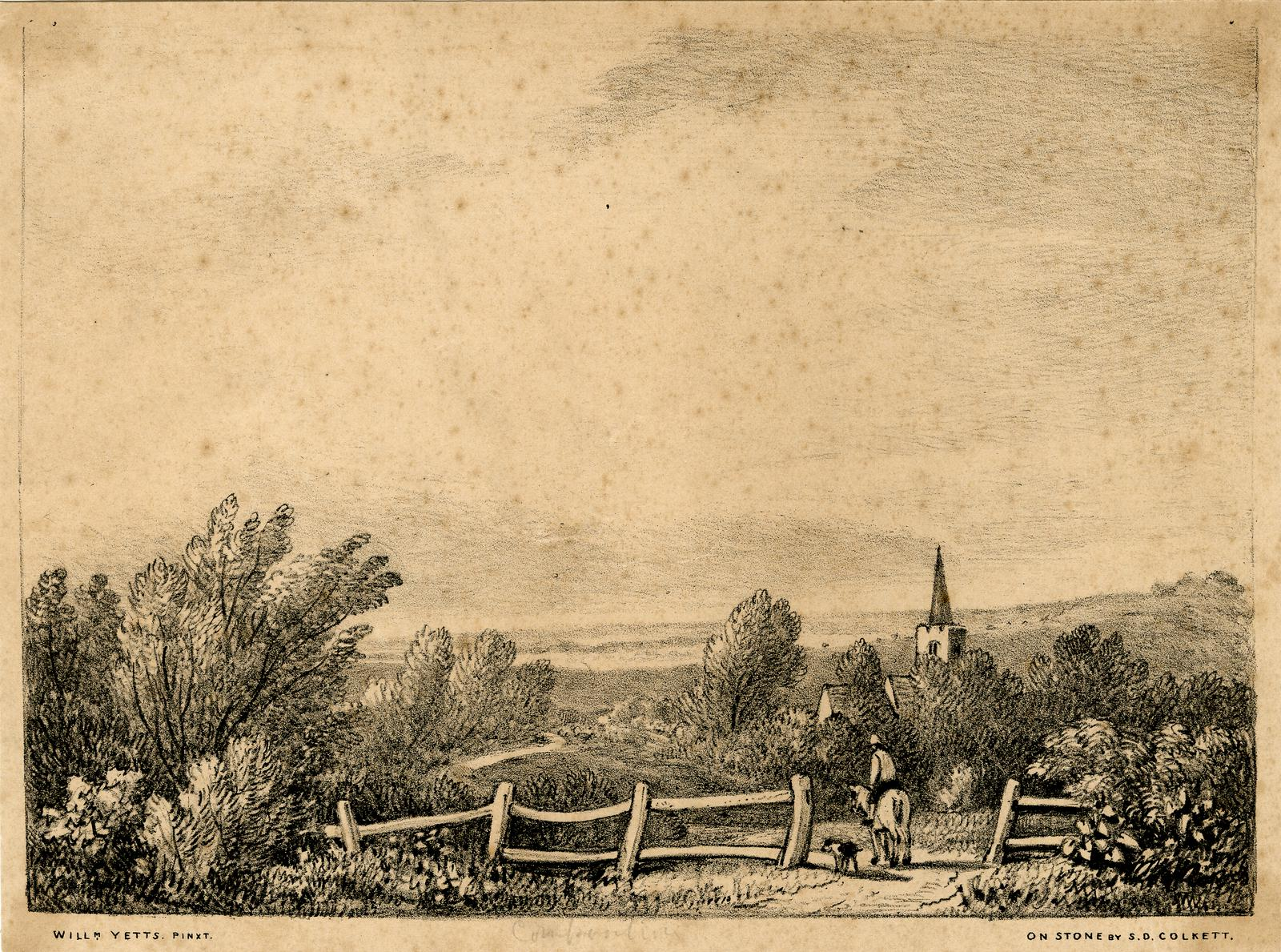
Landscape by Samuel David Colkett

Samuel David Colkett (1806– 24 January 1863) was an English artist, known for his work in oil painting . He was a member of the Norwich School of painters.

== Life ==
Samuel David Colkett was born in 1806 in Norwich and was christened on 2 March at St. Stephen's Church, the son of William Samuel Colkett and Susannah Sharp. Colkett's father, who died early, owned a chemist's on St. Stephen's Street in Norwich: his mother took over the shop after her husband's death. He studied under James Stark. Between 1822 and 1833 he exhibited regularly in both Norwich and London. Between 1828 and 1836 he worked in London, before returning to Norwich to set up as a drawing master and an art restorer. In 1844 he moved to Great Yarmouth, and then to Cambridge in 1854. He died on 24 January 1863 and was buried in the Mill Road Cemetery, Cambridge.

== Victoria Susanna Colkett ==
Samuel's daughter Victoria Susanna was born in 1840, when the family were living in Cambridge. She exhibited on a regular basis at the British Institution. In 1874 she married the accomplished watercolourist Harry Hine, and so her works are sometimes signed using her married surname. She died in 1926.

== Bibliography ==
- Walpole, Josephine (1997). Art and Artists of the Norwich School. Woodbridge: Antique Collectors' Club Holme. ISBN 1-85149-261-5.
