= Norwich school of painters =

19th-century British art movement

The Norwich school of painters was the first provincial art movement established in Britain, active in the early 19th century. Artists of the school were inspired by the natural environment of the Norfolk landscape and owed some influence to the work of landscape painters of the Dutch Golden Age such as Hobbema and Ruisdael.

== History ==
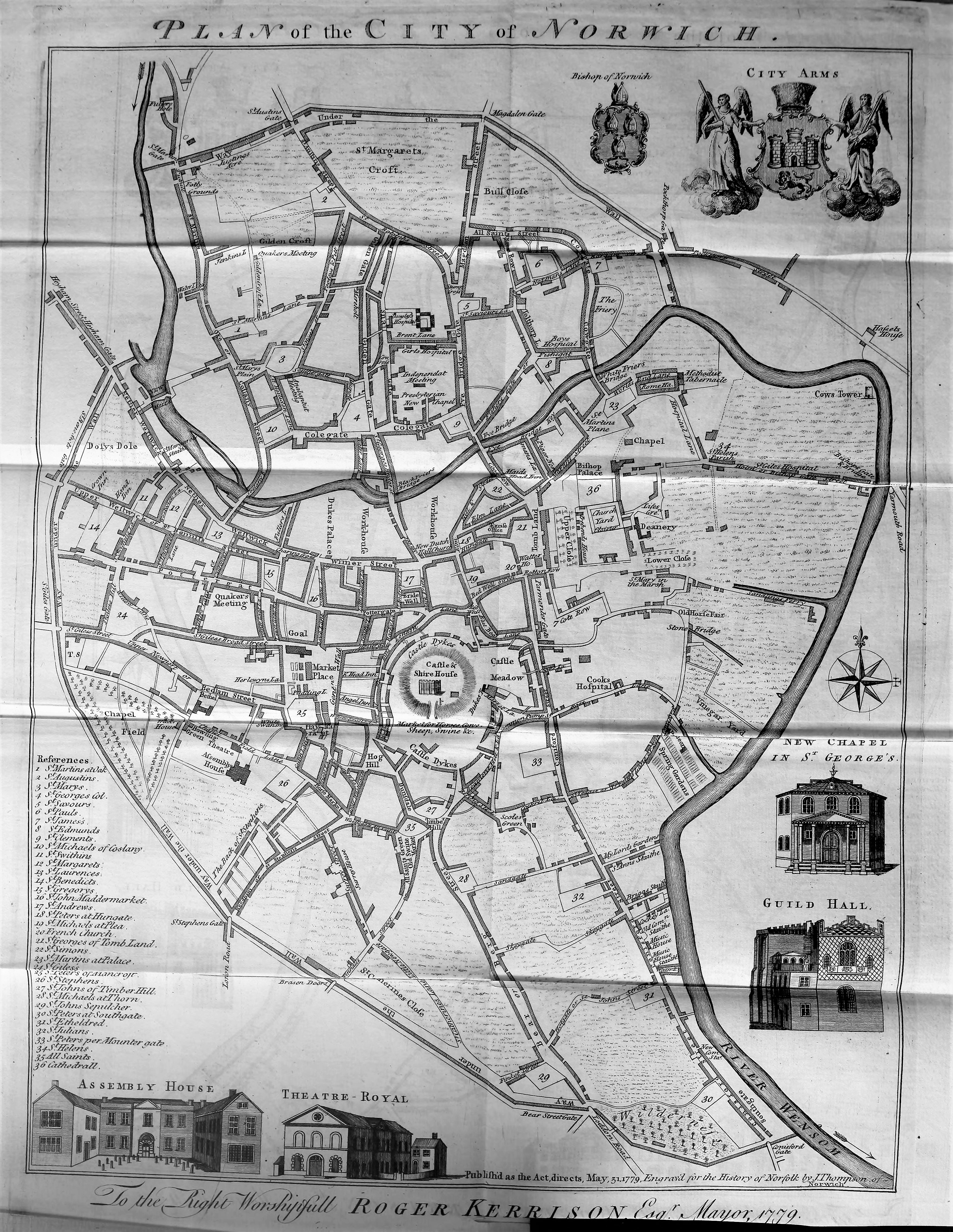
Map of Norwich 1781

The Norwich Society of Artists was founded in 1803 by John Crome and Robert Ladbrooke as a club where artists could meet to exchange ideas. Its aims were "an enquiry into the rise, progress and present state of painting, architecture, and sculpture, with a view to point out the best methods of study to attain the greater perfection in these arts." The society's first meeting was in "The Hole in the Wall" tavern; two years later it moved to premises which allowed it to offer members work and exhibition space. Its first exhibition opened in 1805, and was such a success that it became an annual event until 1825. The building was demolished but the society re-opened three years later, in 1828, as "The Norfolk and Suffolk Institution for the Promotion of the Fine Arts" at a different venue and exhibitions continued until 1833.

The leading light of the movement was John Crome who attracted many friends and pupils until his death in 1821. The mantle of leadership then fell on John Sell Cotman, a member of the society since 1807, who continued to keep the society together until he left Norwich for London in 1834. The society effectively ceased to exist from that date.

A major achievement of the Norwich School was that a small group of self-taught, working class artists aided by the modest patronage available locally was able to depict the rural landscape surrounding Norwich with remarkable vividness.Rather than merely imitating seventeenth-century Dutch painting,Crome and Cotman along with Joseph Stannard developed a style of landscape painting that deserves greater recognition;indeed, the use of broad washes of color in J. S. Cotman’s water-colours anticipates French Impressionism.

One reason the Norwich school artists are not so well known as other painters of the period, notably Constable and Turner, is because the majority of their canvases were collected by the industrialist J. J. Colman (of Colman's mustard fame), and have been on permanent display in Norwich Castle Museum since the 1880s. This lack of wider exposure was remedied in 2001, when many of the school's major works were exhibited outside Norwich for the first time at the Tate Gallery, London in 2000.

== Gallery ==
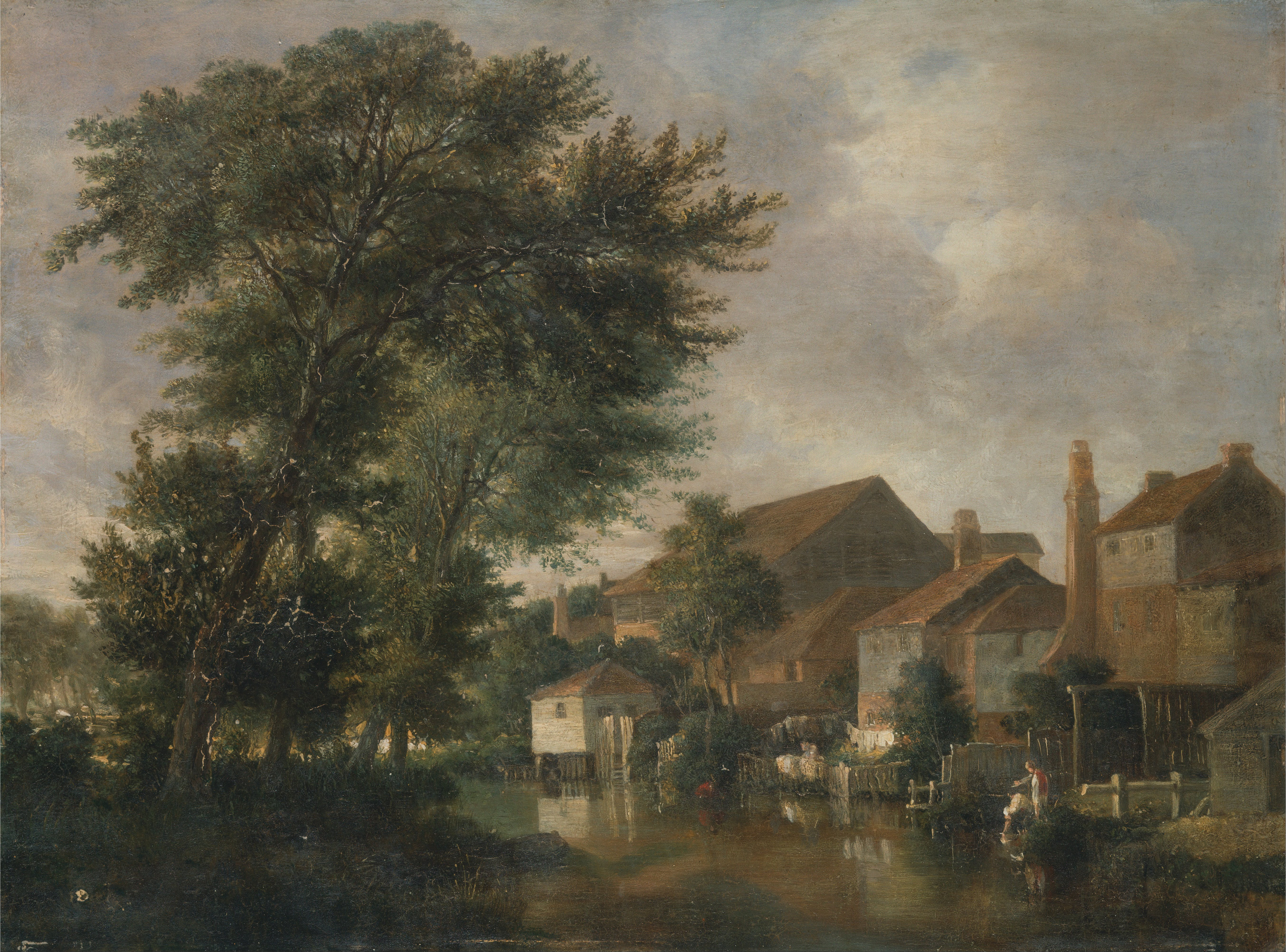
John Crome, The River Wensum, Norwich (1814)

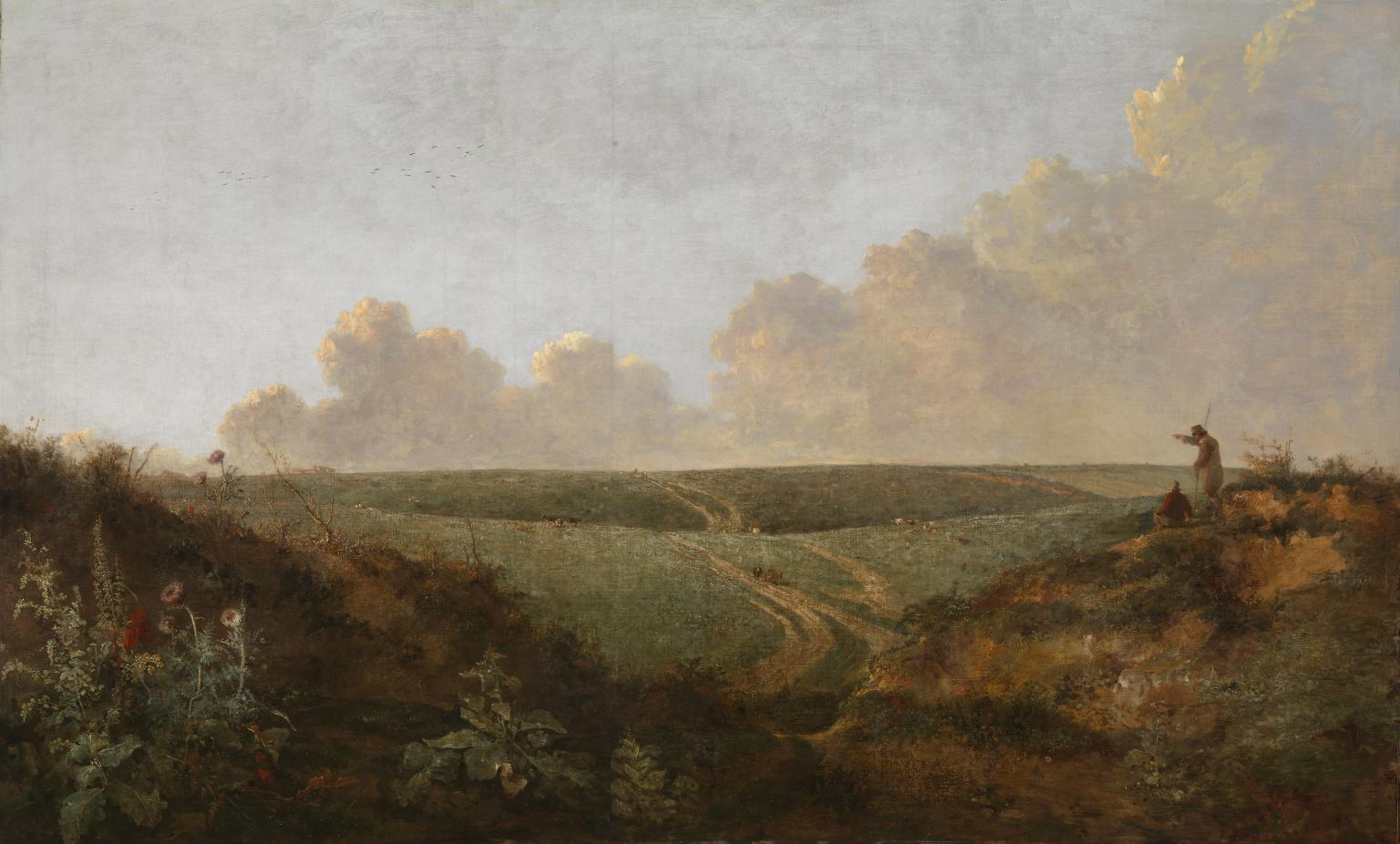
John Crome, Mousehold Heath, Norwich (c. 1818), Tate Britain

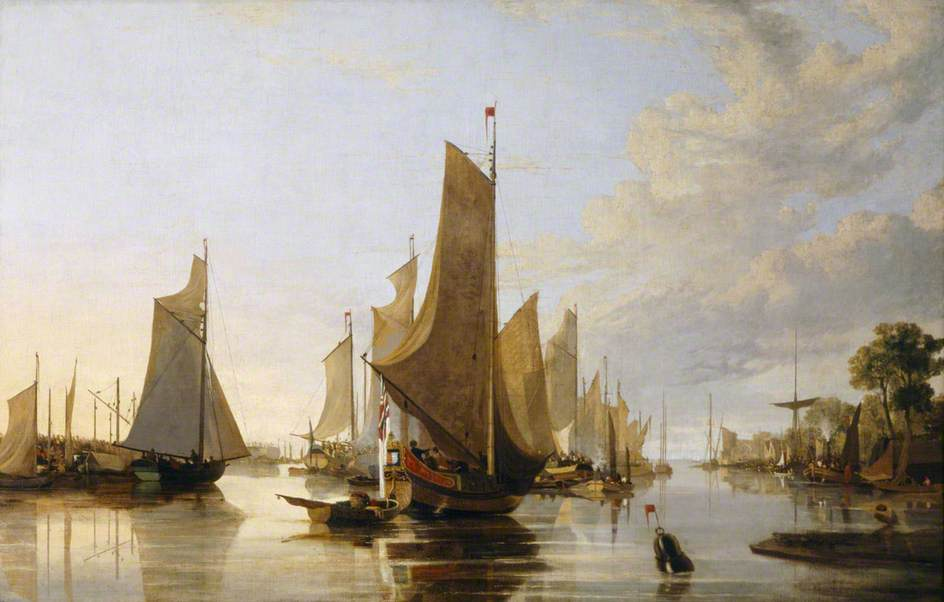
John Crome, Yarmouth Water Frolic, (1821) Kenwood House

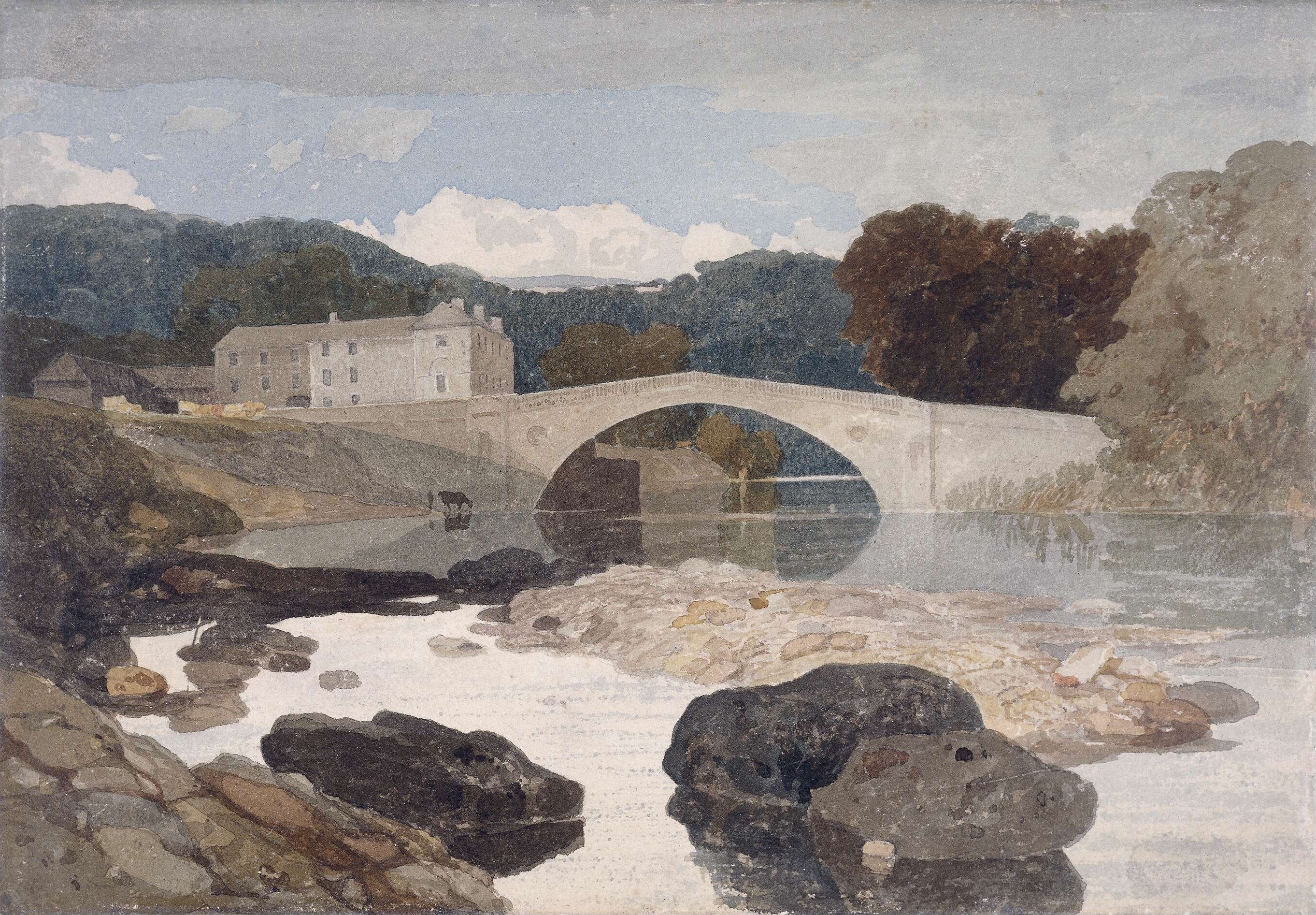
John Sell Cotman, Greta Bridge (c. 1806), British Museum

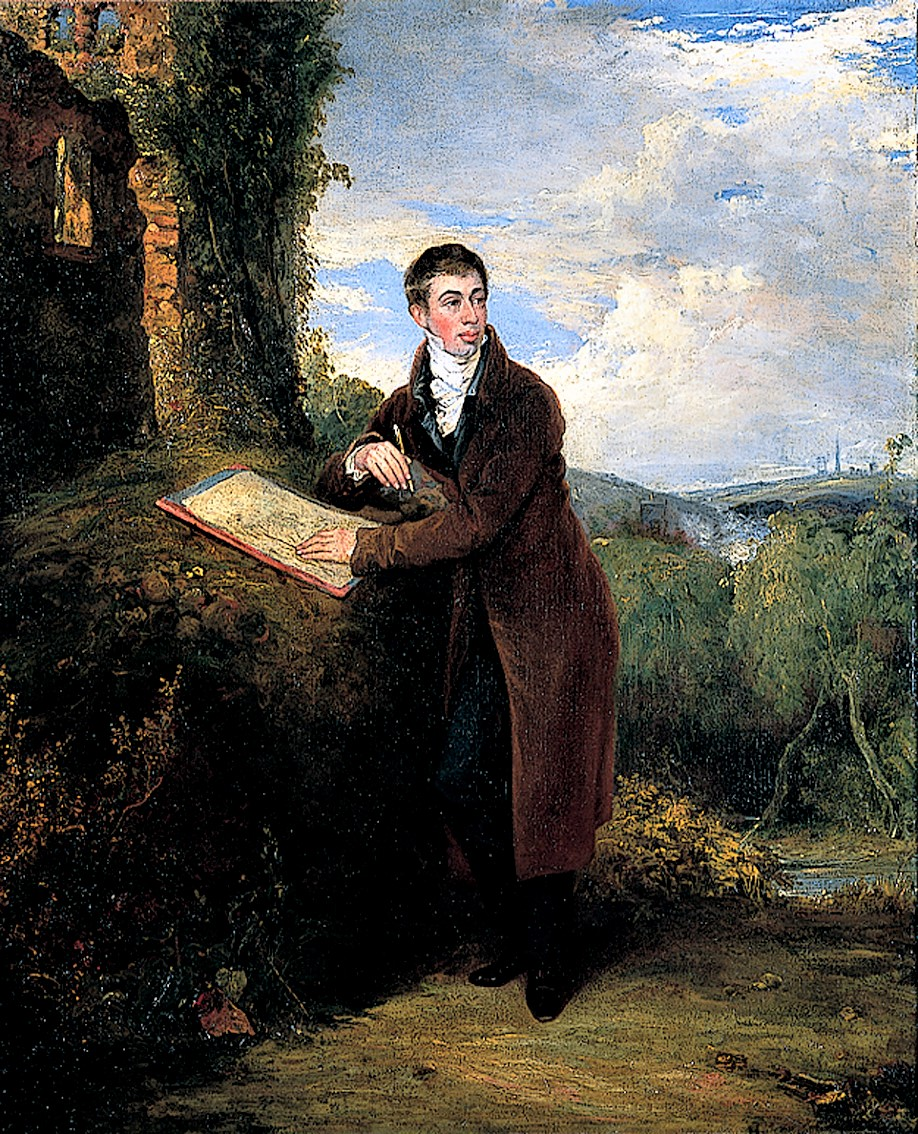
Joseph Clover Portrait of George Vincent, background by Vincent (undated), Norfolk Museums Collections

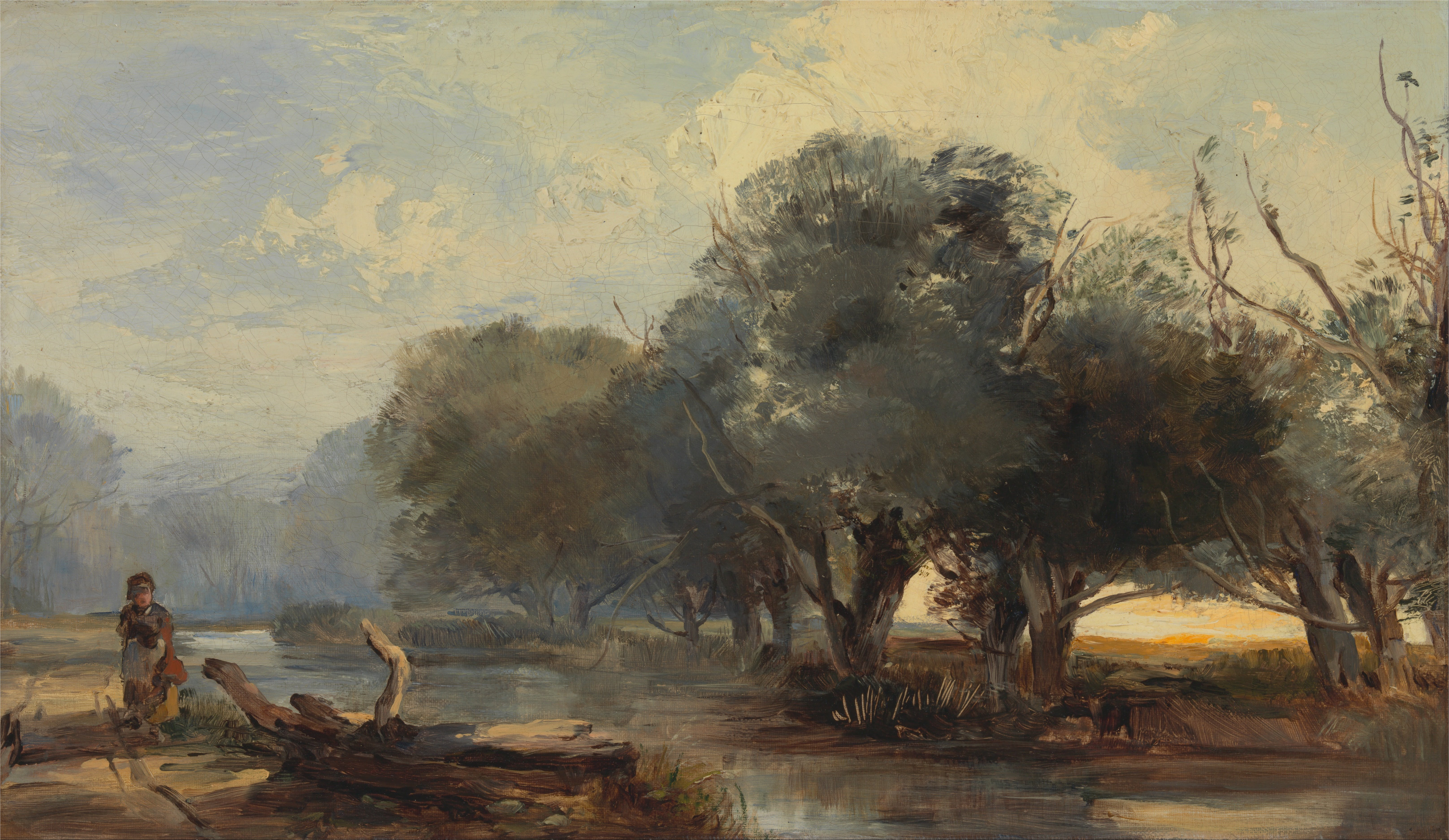
Henry Bright, On the Norfolk Broads (c. 1855), Yale Center for British Art

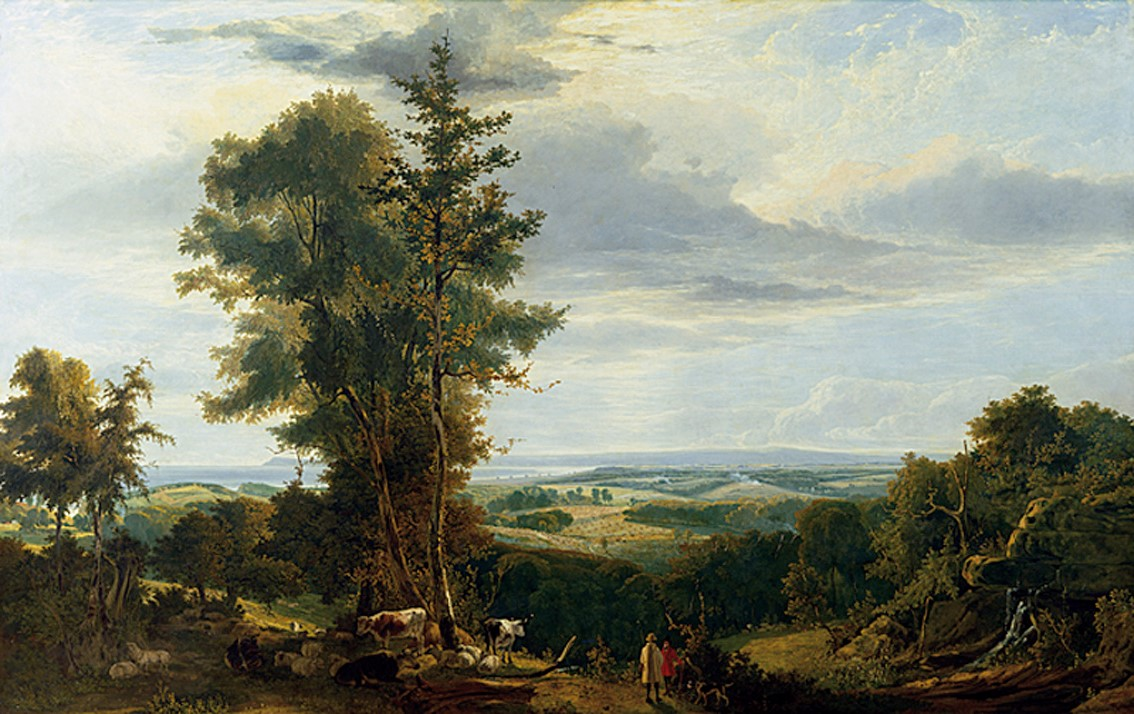
George Vincent, A distant view of Pevensey Bay, the landing place of King William the Conqueror (1820), Norfolk Museums Collections

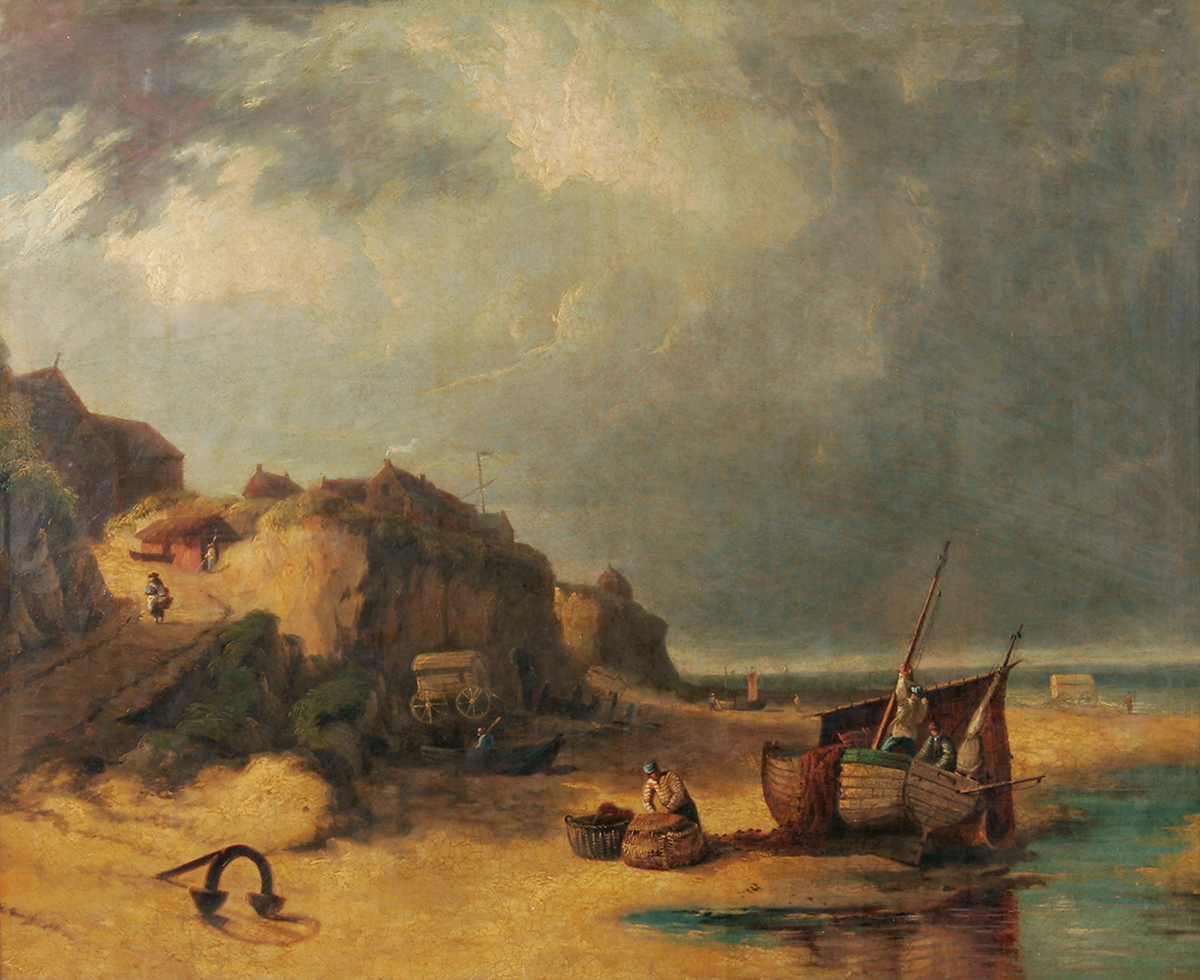
Robert Ladbrooke, Beach Scene, Mundesley, Norfolk (undated), Norfolk Museums Collections

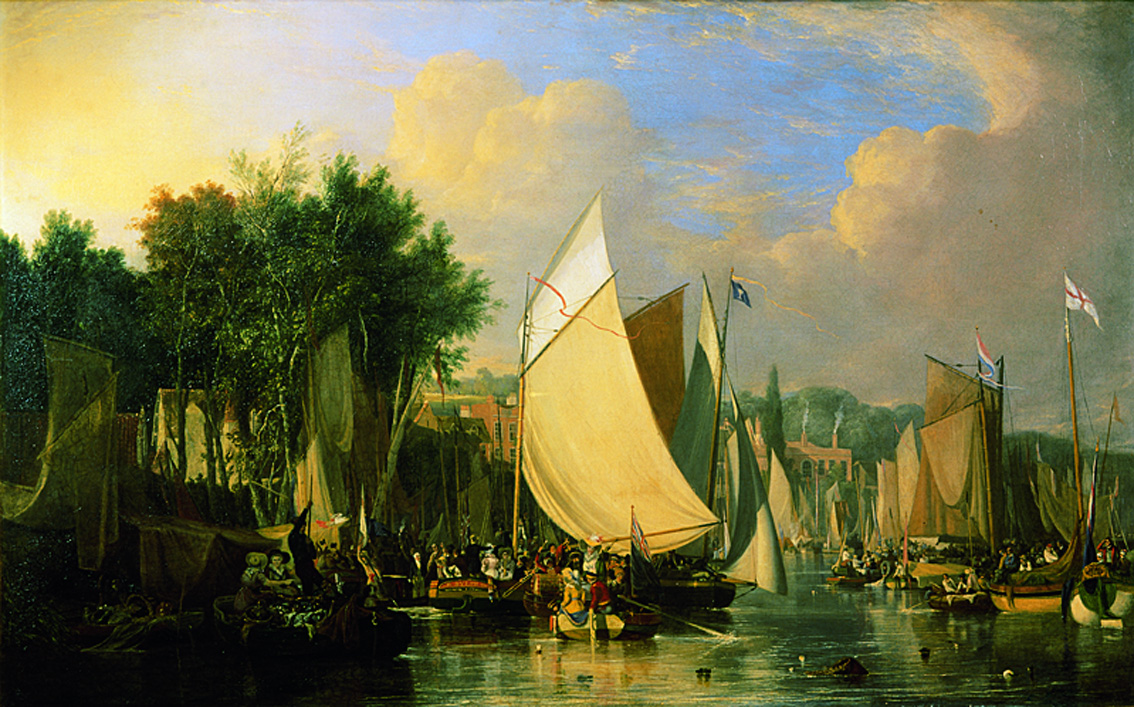
Joseph Stannard, Thorpe Water Frolic, Afternoon (undated), Norfolk Museums Collections

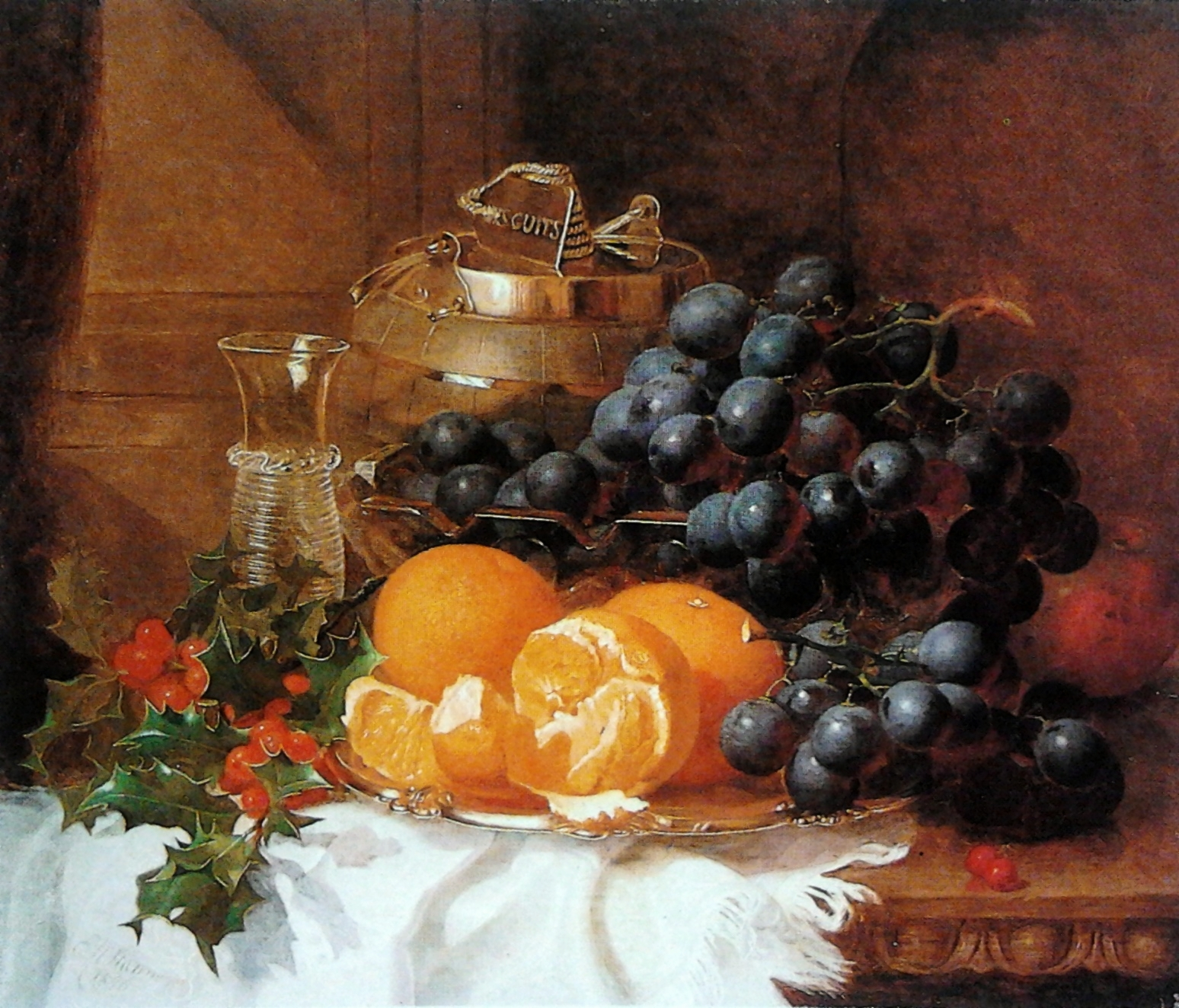
Eloise Harriet Stannard, Christmas still life (1886), Museum of John Paul II Collection, Warsaw

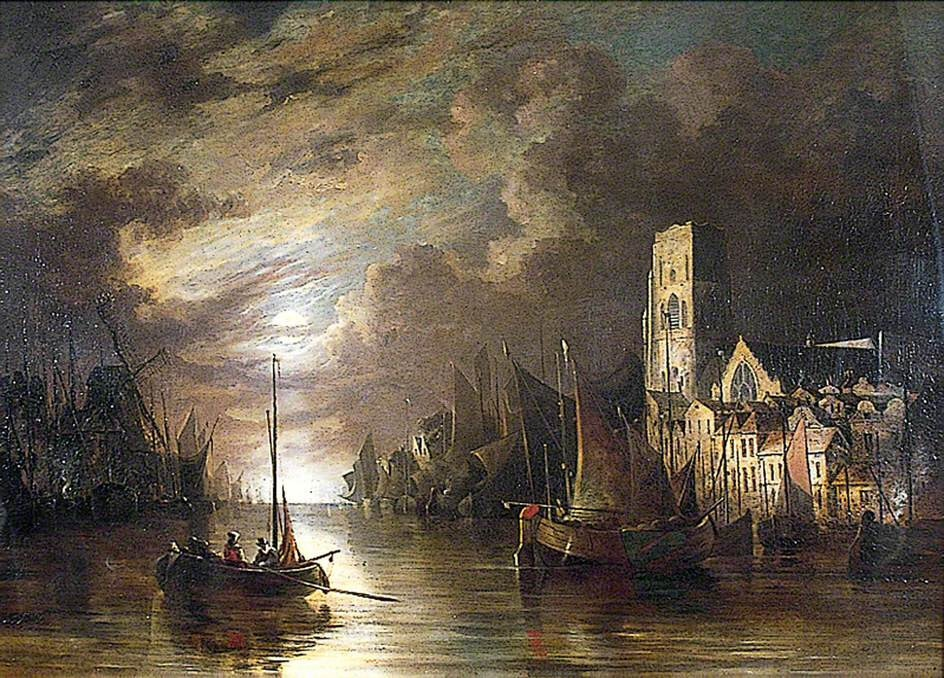
John Berney Crome, Amsterdam, the Netherlands (undated), Norfolk Museums Collections

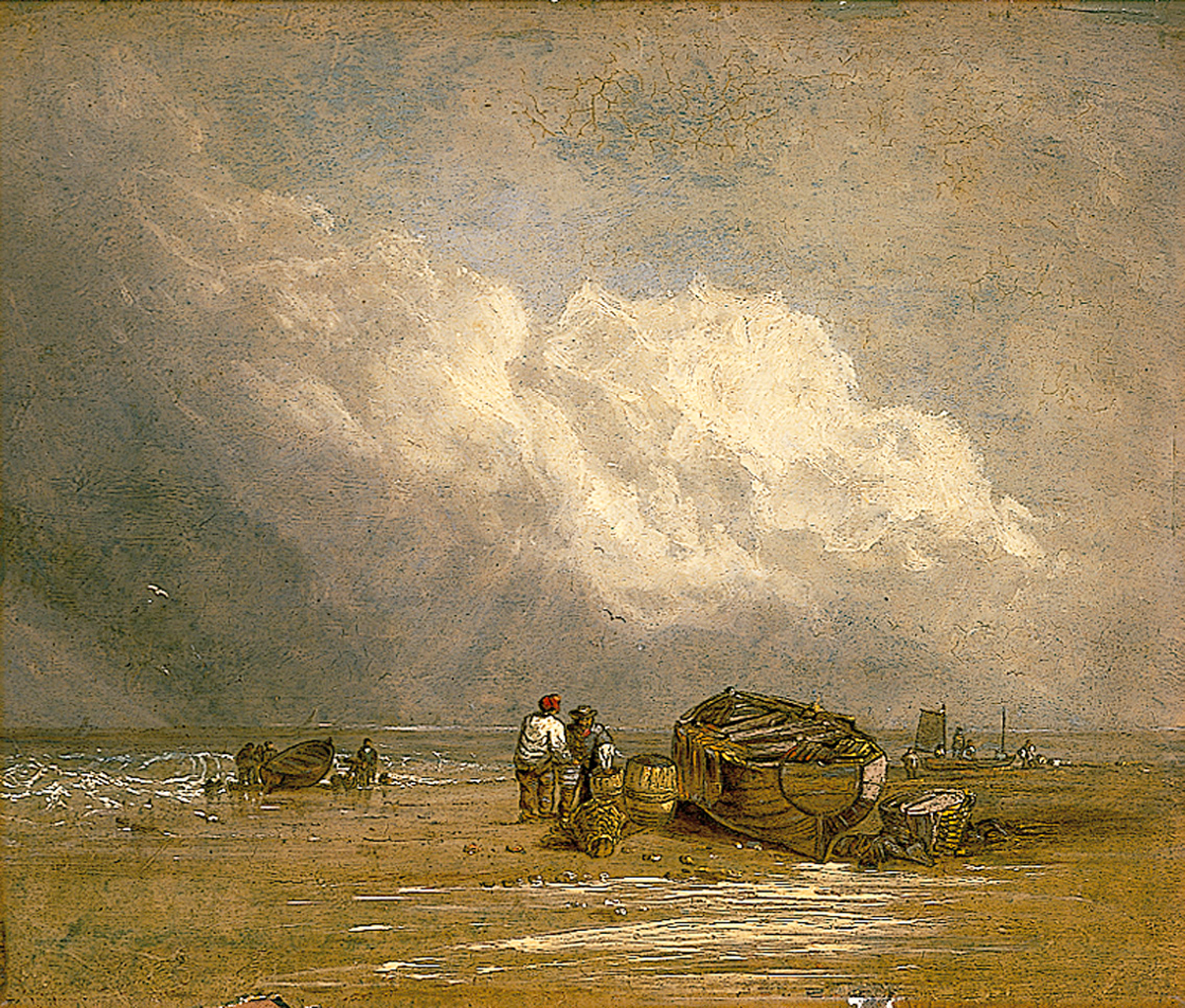
Robert Ladbrooke, Fishermen on a Beach with Boats (undated), Norfolk Museums Collections

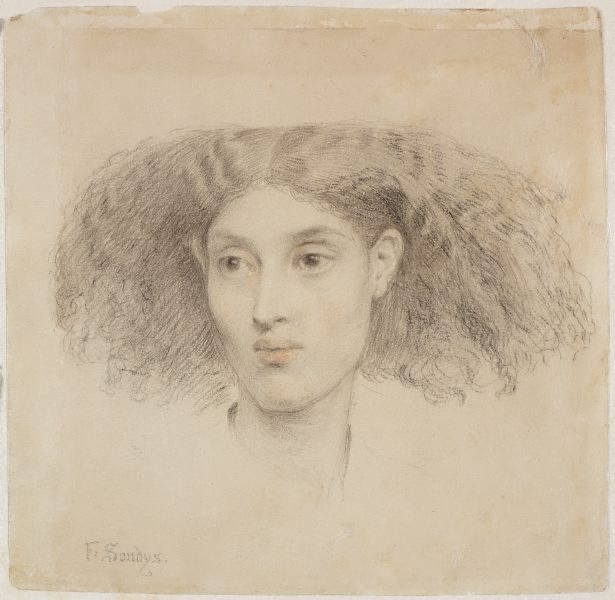
Frederick Sandys, Study of the head of a young mulatto woman full face (c. 1859), Art Gallery of New South Wales

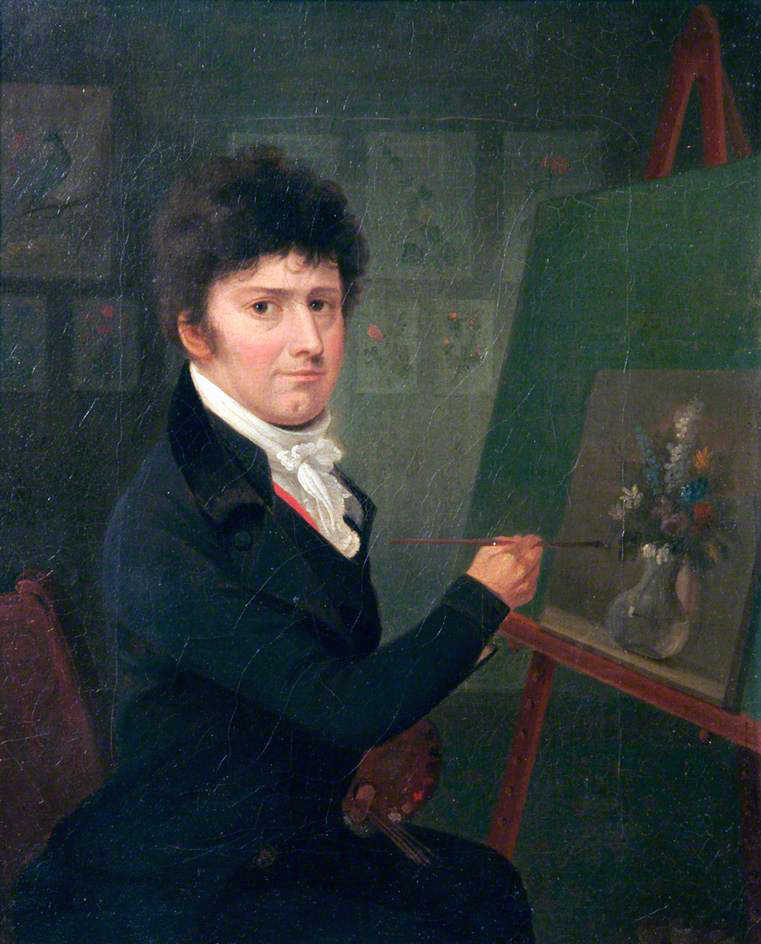
James Sillett, Self portrait 1803 (1803), Norfolk Museums Collections

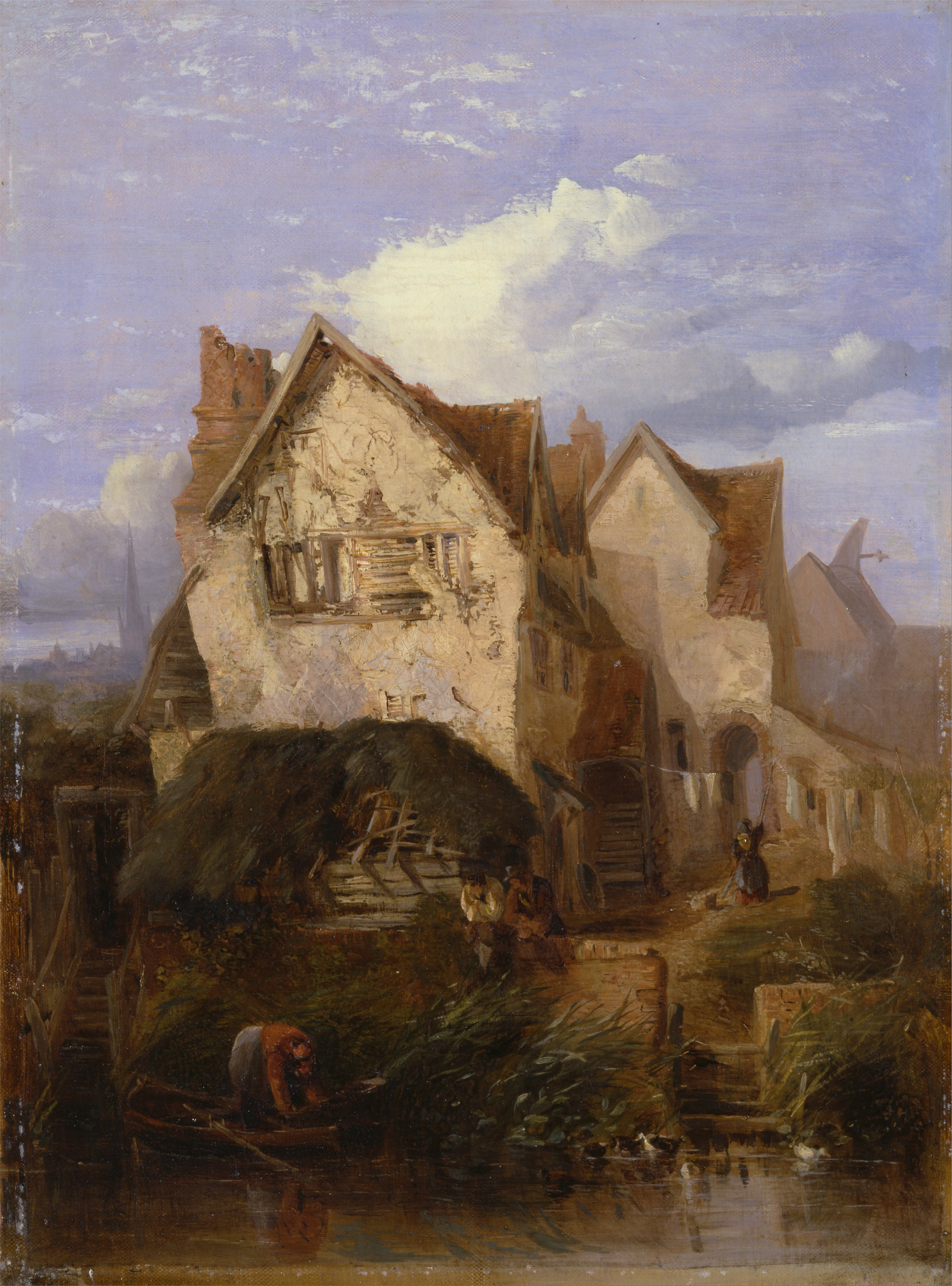
Thomas Lound, A View near Norwich (c. 1850), Yale Center for British Art

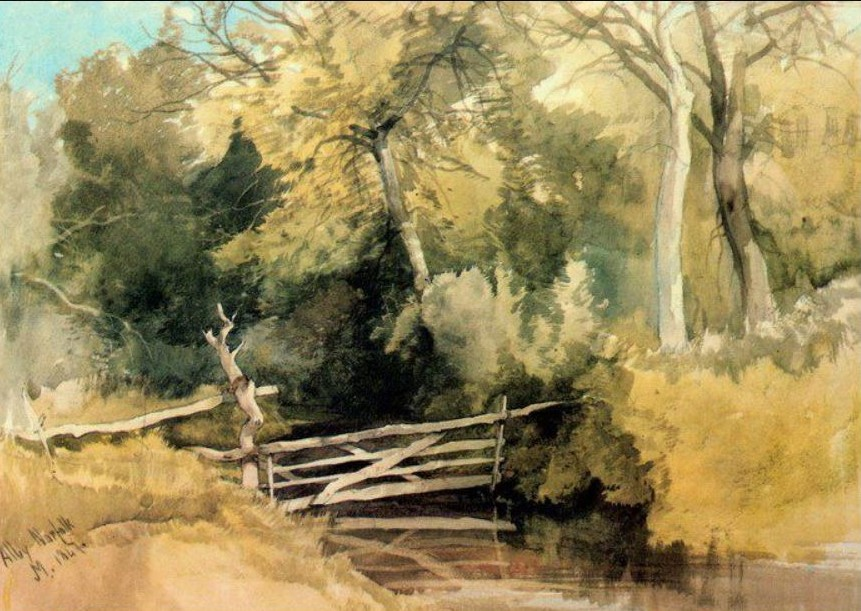
John Middleton, Alby (1847), Norfolk Museums Collections

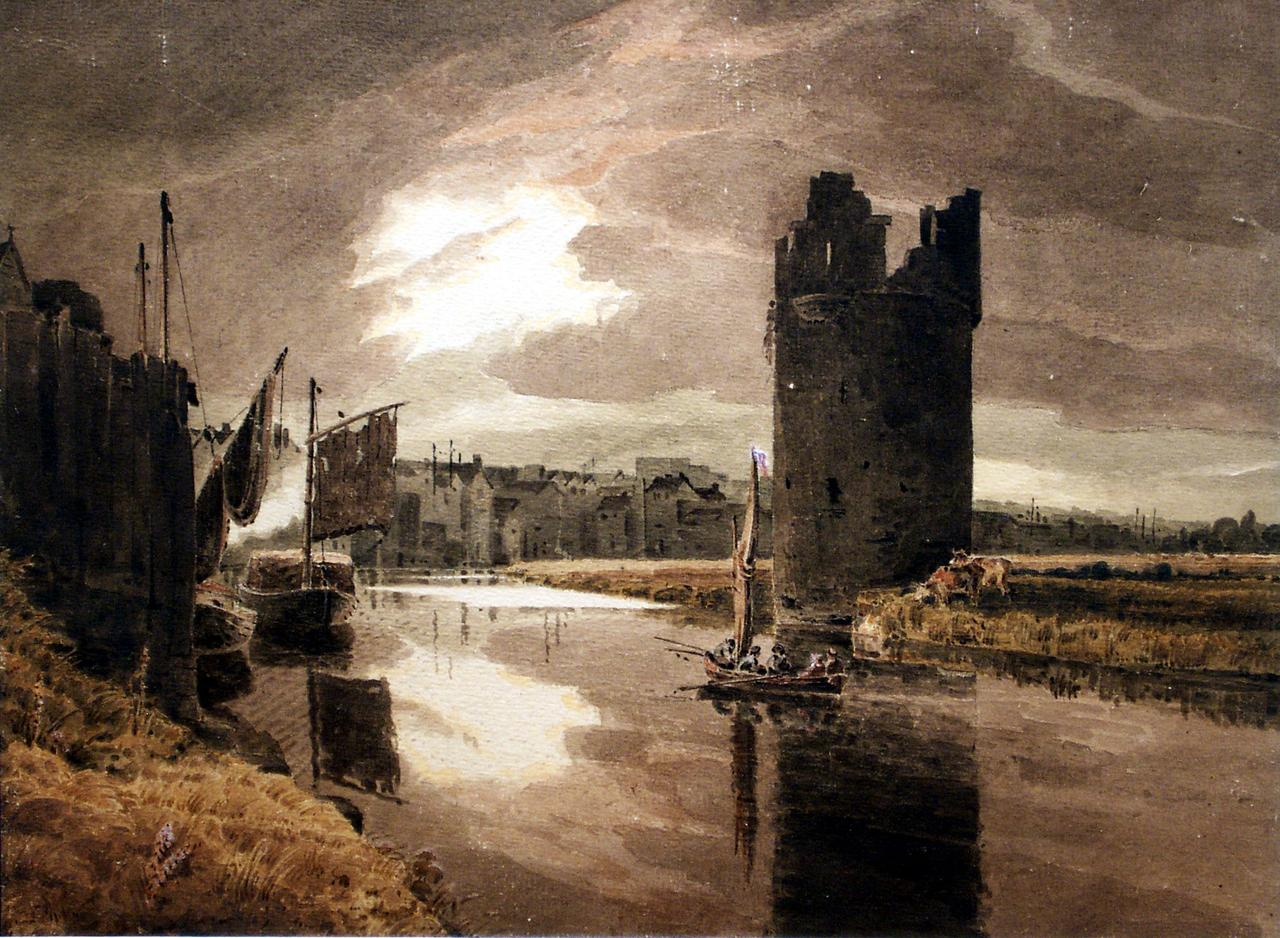
John Thirtle, Devil's Tower near King Street Gates – Evening (undated), Norfolk Museums Collections

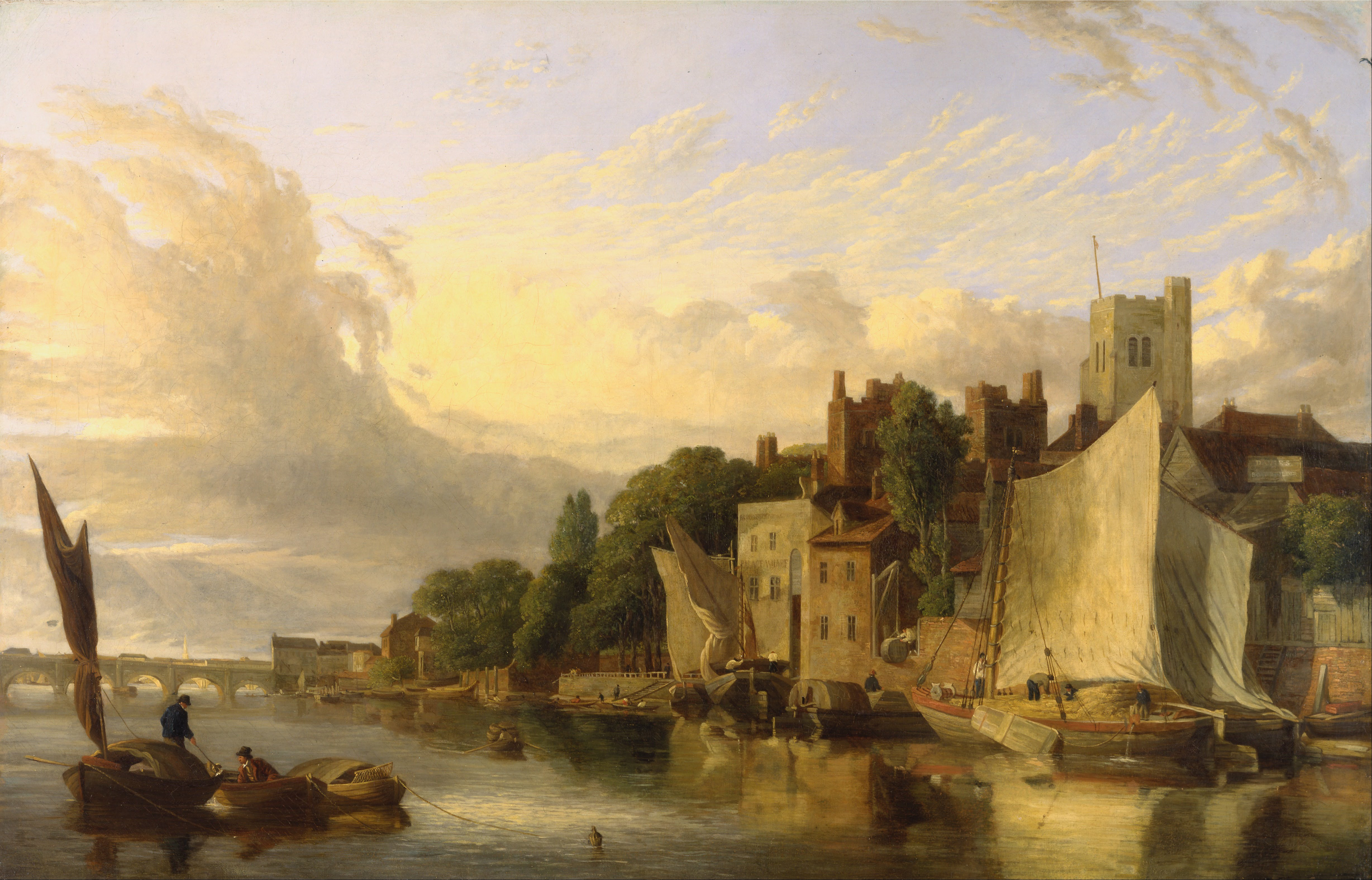
James Stark, Lambeth from the River looking towards Westminster Bridge (1818), Yale Center for British Art

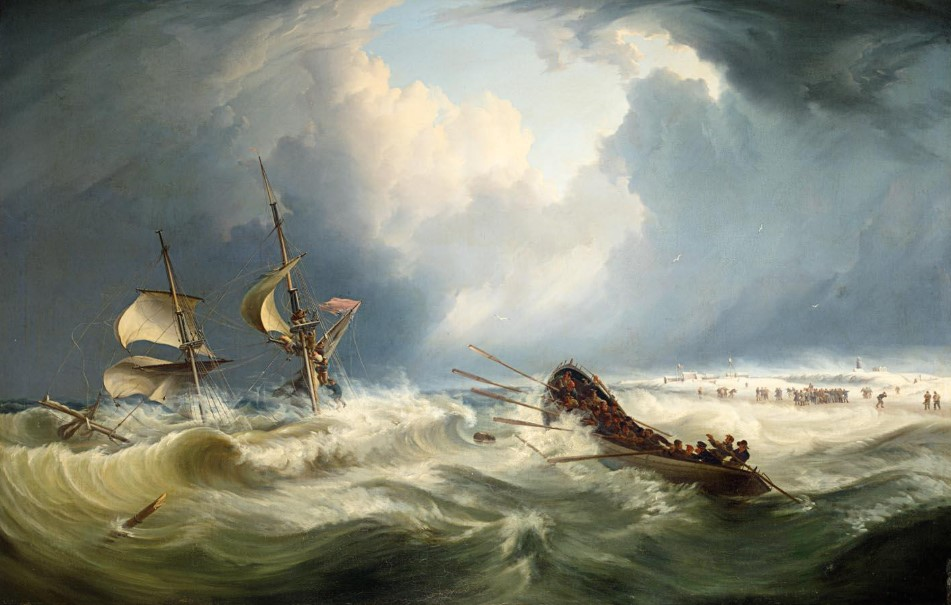
William Joy, The Rescue of the Survivors of the Brig Henry (undated)

== Members and associates ==
- Henry Bright
- James Bulwer
- Joseph Clover
- Samuel David Colkett and Victoria Susannah Colkett
- Edwin Cooper
- Daniel Coppin
- Frederick George Cotman
- John Joseph Cotman
- John Sell Cotman
- Miles Edmund Cotman
- John Crome ("Old Crome")
- John Berney Crome ("Young Crome")
- Edward Thomas Daniell
- Robert Dixon
- William Philip Barnes Freeman
- Joseph Geldart
- Charles Hodgson
- David Hodgson
- John Cantiloe Joy and William Joy
- Frederick Ladbrooke
- John Berney Ladbrooke
- Robert Ladbrooke
- Robert Leman
- Thomas Lound
- Horace Beevor Love
- Maria Margitson
- John Middleton
- Henry Ninham
- John Ninham
- Alfred Priest
- Anthony Sandys
- Frederick Sandys
- Obadiah Short
- James Sillett
- Alfred Stannard
- Alfred George Stannard
- Eloise Harriet Stannard
- Emily Stannard (Emily Coppin)
- Joseph Stannard
- Arthur James Stark
- James Stark
- John Thirtle
- George Vincent
