= Alfred George Stannard =

- Born: 1827
- Died: 1885 (aged 57–58)
- Known for: Landscape painting
- Movement: Norwich School of painters

Alfred George Stannard (1827–1885) was an English painter of landscapes and a member of the Norwich School of painters.

== Life ==
Alfred George Stannard, who was probably born in 1827, was christened on 15 July 1827 at St George's Church, Tombland, Norwich by Alfred Stannard and his wife Martha. Alfred Stannard was a water-colourist and Martha Sparkes was herself an amateur painter. They produced a family of fourteen children, which included the painter Eloise Harriet Stannard.

Alfred George studied under his father, exhibited works at the British Institution and used visits to Wales and Switzerland to broaden his outlook. he married the Norwich artist Anne Hodgson.

== Bibliography ==
- Walpole, Josephine (1997). Art and Artists of the Norwich School. Woodbridge: Antique Collectors' Club. ISBN 1-85149-261-5.
