= Lynn Stannard =

Lynn Stannard is a Canadian judge. She was appointed to the Provincial Court of Manitoba on August 5, 1999.

Prior to her appointment to the bench, Judge Stannard worked with the Justice Department (since 1984). She served as a youth court prosecutor, specialized in prosecutions involving child abuse and domestic violence, and became the senior Crown attorney of the Family Violence Unit when it was created in 1990. She also held the position of Director of Prosecutions. She received her law degree from the University of Manitoba in 1983.
