= Edwin Cooper (artist) =

English painter

- Born: 1 January 1785; Bury St. Edmunds
- Died: 1833 (aged 48)
- Known for: Professional painting of animals
- Movement: Norwich School of painters

Edwin Cooper (1 January 1785 – 1833) was an English artist, known for his work in painting animals. He was an honorary member of the Norwich Society, and is considered to be one of the Norwich School of painters.

== Life ==
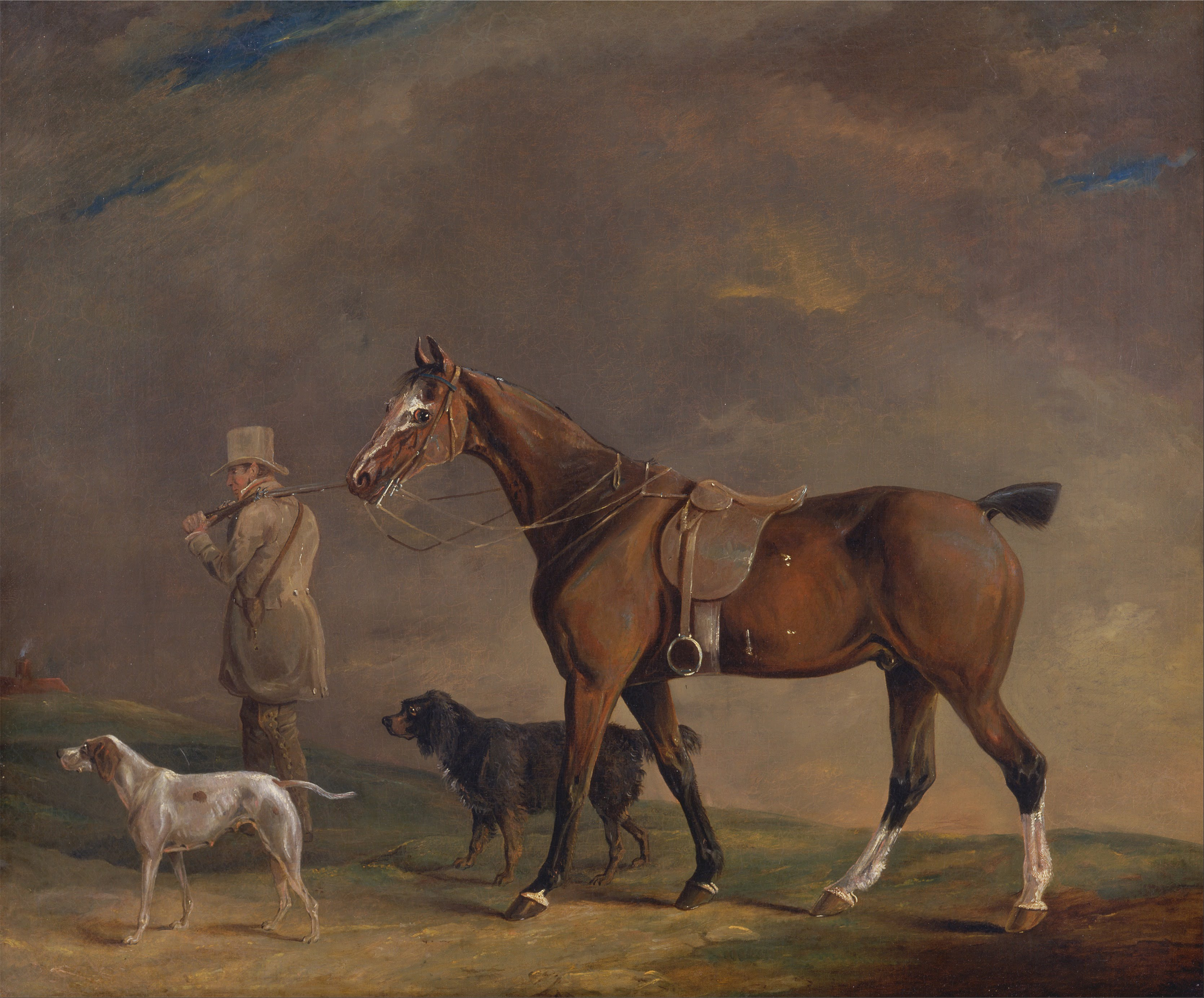
A Sportsman with Shooting Pony and Gun Dogs (c.1815) Yale Center for British Art

Edwin Cooper was born on 1 January 1785, the son of Daniel Cooper and his wife Martha Hockley, and was baptised at St. James' Church, Bury St. Edmunds. He studied under his father, a professional miniaturist who taught drawing at a school. During his career he exhibited nearly 100 works of art: 200 of his paintings were exhibited by the Norwich Society after his death.

== Bibliography ==
- Walpole, Josephine (1997). Art and Artists of the Norwich School. Woodbridge: Antique Collectors' Club Holme. ISBN 1-85149-261-5.
