= Eloise Harriet Stannard =

British painter (1829–1915)

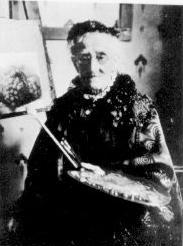
- Born: 1 February 1829; Norwich, England
- Died: 1915
- Known for: Still life painting
- Movement: Norwich School of painters

Eloise Harriet Stannard (1829–1915) was a British 19th century painter known for her still life work. She was one of only two notable women artists associated with the Norwich School of painters, Britain's first provincial art movement.

== Biography ==
Eloise Harriet Stannard was born in Norwich, Norfolk, on 1 February 1829, and christened on 12 February at St Peter Parmentergate, Norwich. She was one of the fourteen children of landscape painter and drawing teacher Alfred Stannard and Martha Stannard (née Sparks). Her uncle was the painter Joseph Stannard; both her father and her uncle were members of the Norwich School of painters, Britain's first provincial art movement. Eloise and her aunt Emily Coppin Stannard (Joseph's wife) would become the only two notable women artists associated with the Norwich School.

Stannard was probably trained as an artist by her father, and her style was influenced by traditional Dutch still life painting, especially the artist Jan van Huysum. Her subjects were mainly fruits—particularly fruits not grown in England—piled in baskets and bowls, set against a monochrome background in natural light and sometimes accented with small insects. Her fine brushwork and multiple paint layers produced a characteristically luminous surface. Stannard is today considered one of Britain's most gifted still life painters. In his book on East Anglian painters, Harold A.E. Day summed up her achievement as follows:

When one considers the work of E.H. Stannard the outstanding feature is her extraordinary good taste; this combined with her sensitive technique and genius places her in the very top rank of British Nineteenth Century still life painters.

Stannard suffered from poor health but still maintained an active career as a painter, exhibiting regularly and becoming so successful that she never needed to take in pupils, as was often the case for women artists in the 19th century. She began exhibiting in 1852, showing at the British Institution (1852–1867), the Royal Academy of Art (1856–1893), the Royal Society of British Artists (1856), and the Royal Glasgow Institute (1861). In 1859, the Art Journal praised her work exhibited at the Royal Academy that year with the following comment

No 509. 'Fruit', Miss E.H. STANNARD, Painted with admirable effect, and in close imitation of the rich maturity of nature.

In 1857, she received a tribute written by George Nicol, Secretary of the British Institution, who wrote,

I cannot refrain from taking this opportunity of telling you that Mr. Lance said to me on the varnishing day, 'Mr. Nicol, it is really too bad to place such a picture as that upon the walls' — pointing to your circular picture. "Why?" "Because it is so good.' We then walked up to it, and he admired it throughout, but especially the painting of the grapes, which he said was beautiful. "I like to see such things; they put me on my mettle.' I asked him if he knew whom it was painted by. He answered, "No." "It is by a lady, Miss Stannard." "Then it does her infinite credit." I took him to your other picture, which he was also much pleased with, but the circular one seems to be the favourite with him. His appreciation of the merits of your pictures must, I think, be gratifying for you to hear.

In 1871 Eloise Stannard received an invitation from the Committee of the Female School of Arts, which asked her to be a judge for the school. Her poor health prevented her from accepting the invitation.

She became a member of the Society of Women Artists in 1871. After 1873, when in the wake of her mother's death she assumed extra family responsibilities, her paintings became smaller and her exhibition career declined.

One of her paintings, Strawberries in a Glass Lid with Glass Bowl of Raspberries Behind (1896), hangs at Norwich Castle, which has the largest collection of works by Norwich School artists.

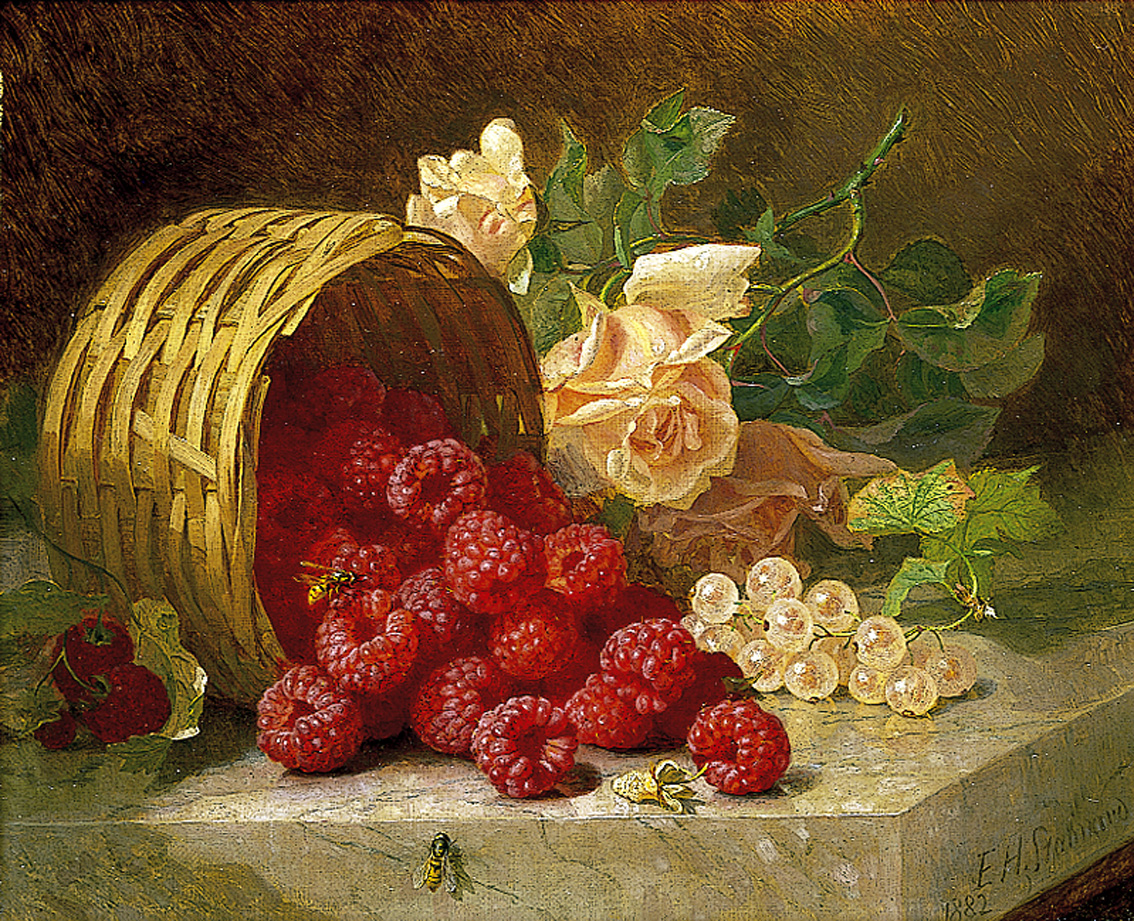
Overturned basket with raspberries, white currants and roses (1882), Norfolk Museums Collections

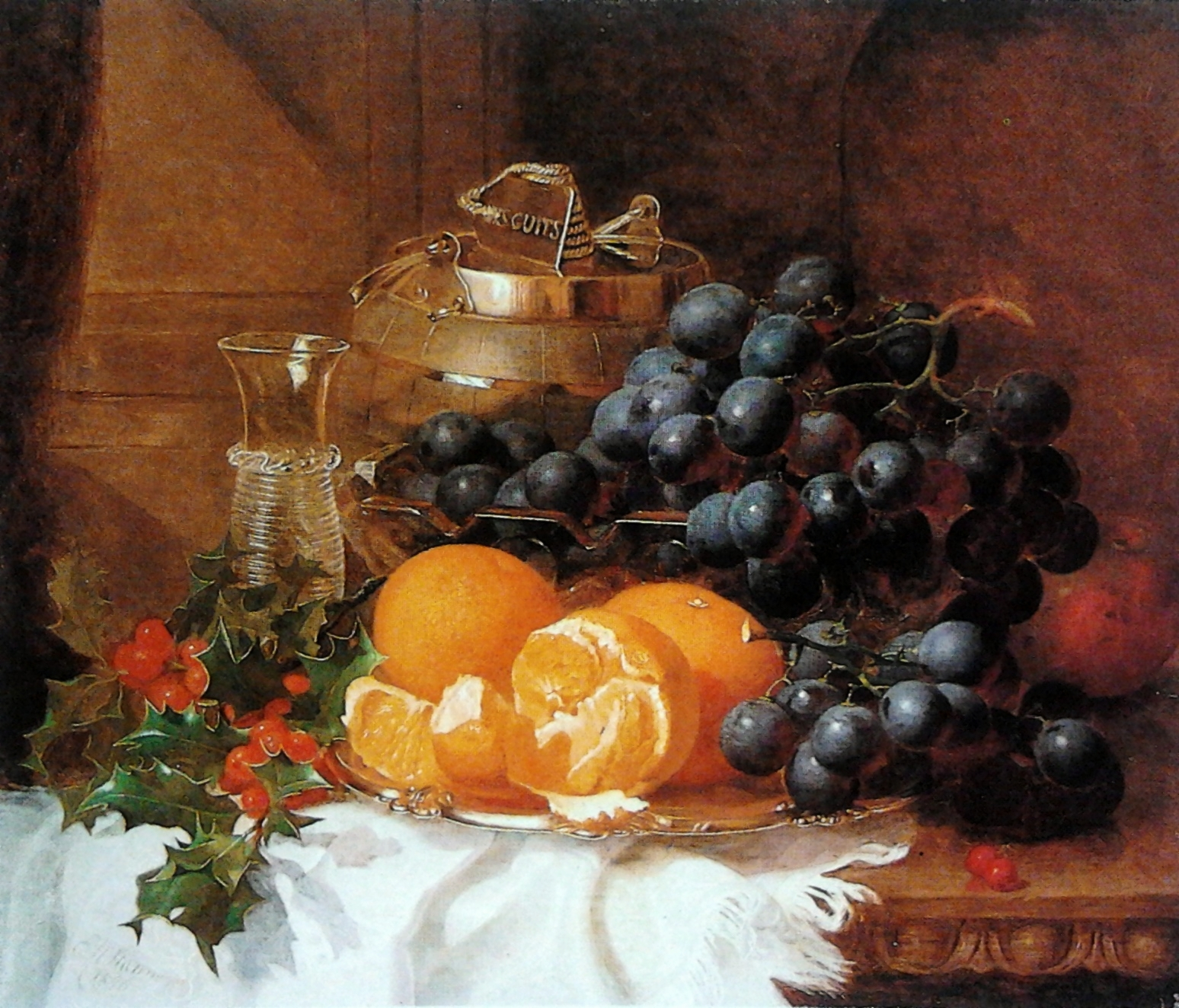
Christmas Still Life (1886), Museum of John Paul II Collection

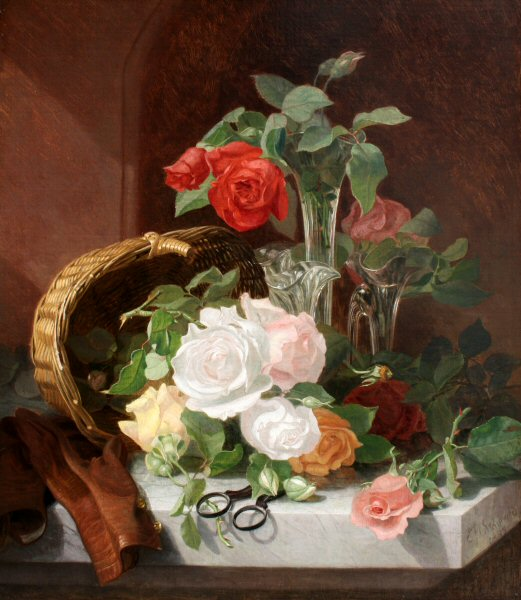
A Still Life of Flowers in a Glass Epergne on a Marble Ledge with Gloves, Wicker Basket and Scissors (1889),

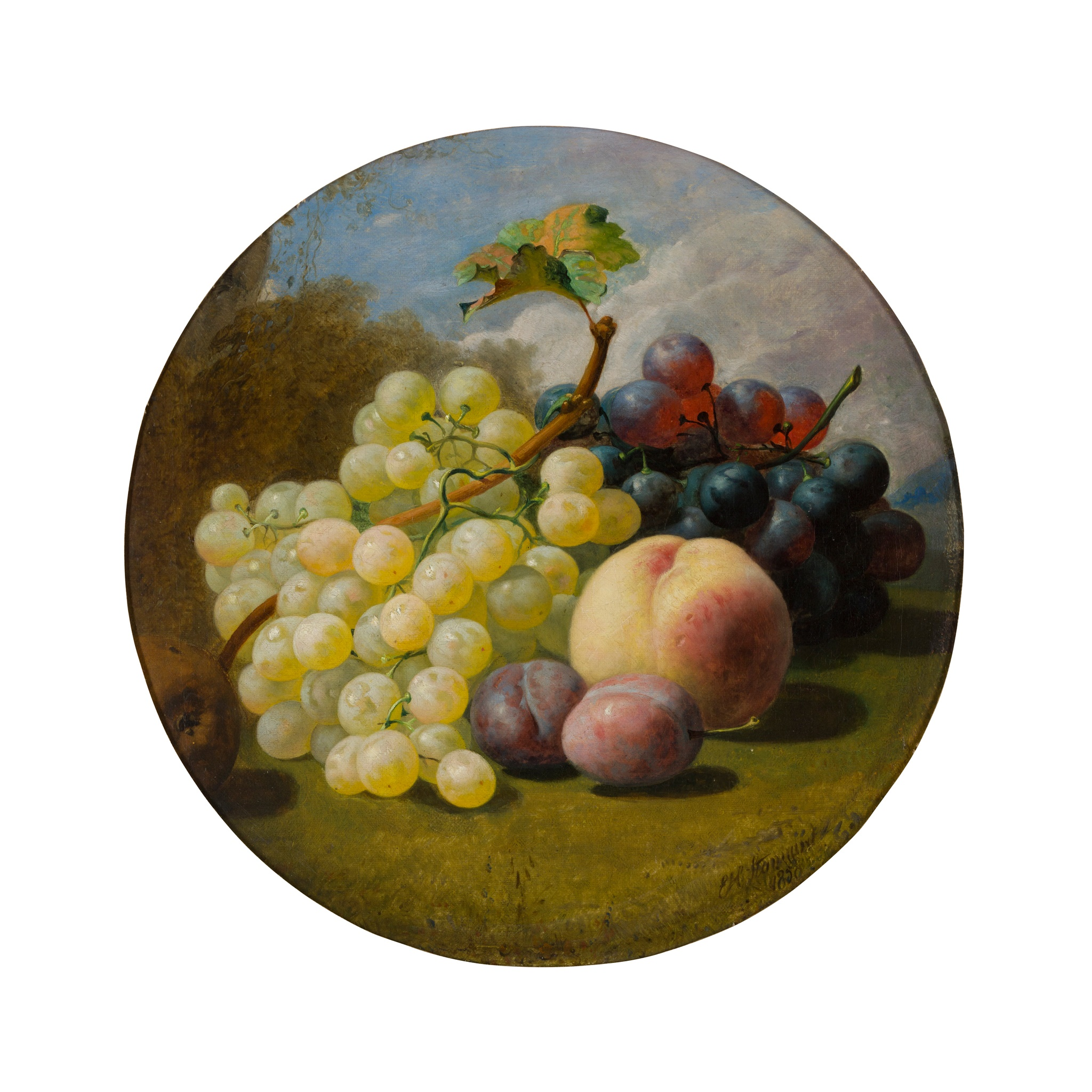
ELOISE HARRIET STANNARD (BRITISH 1829-1915) STILL LIFE OF ASSORTED FRUIT ON A BANK Signed and dated 1850, oil on canvas,

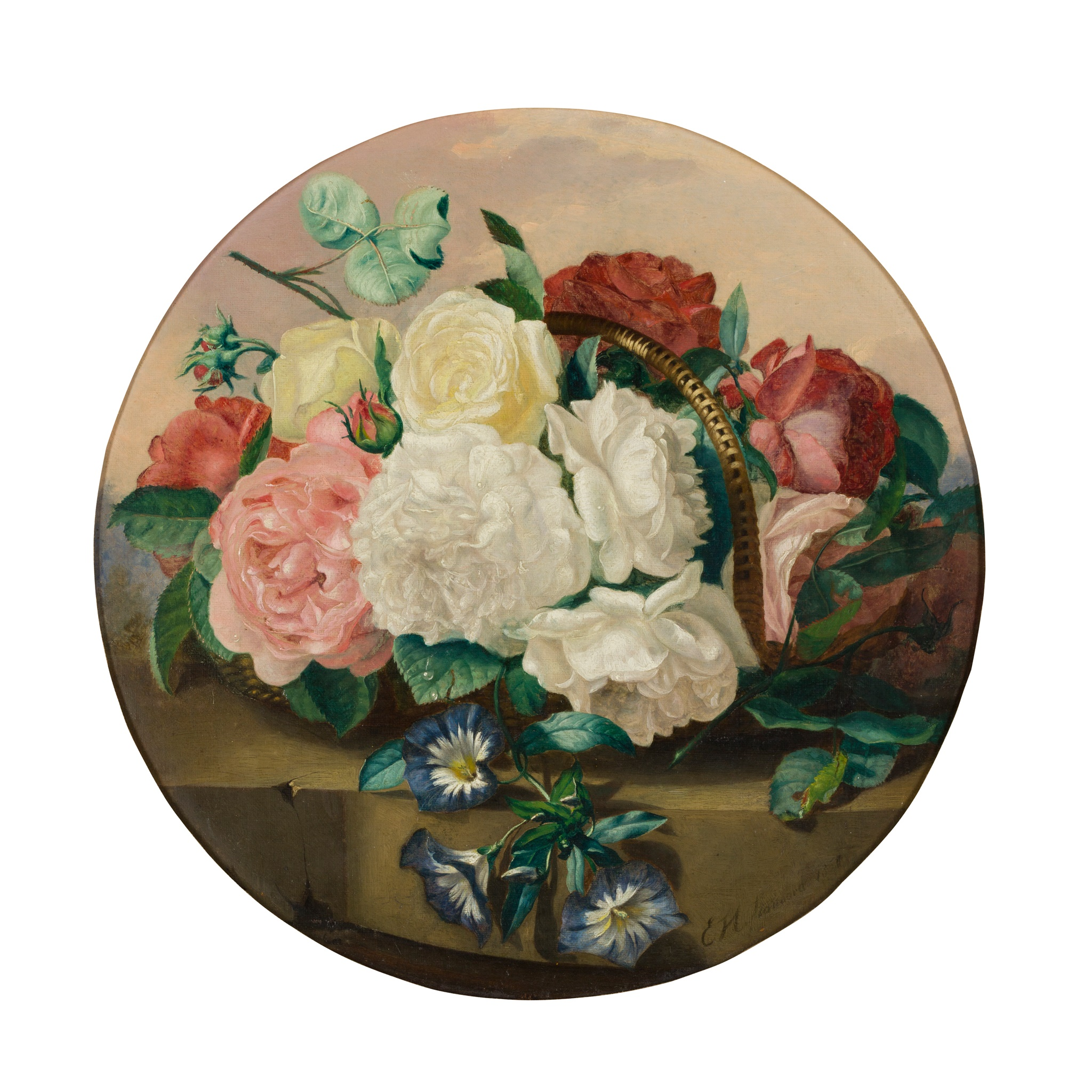
ELOISE HARRIET STANNARD (BRITISH 1829-1915) STILL LIFE OF ASSORTED ROSES ON A LEDGE Signed and indistinctly dated, oil on canvas,

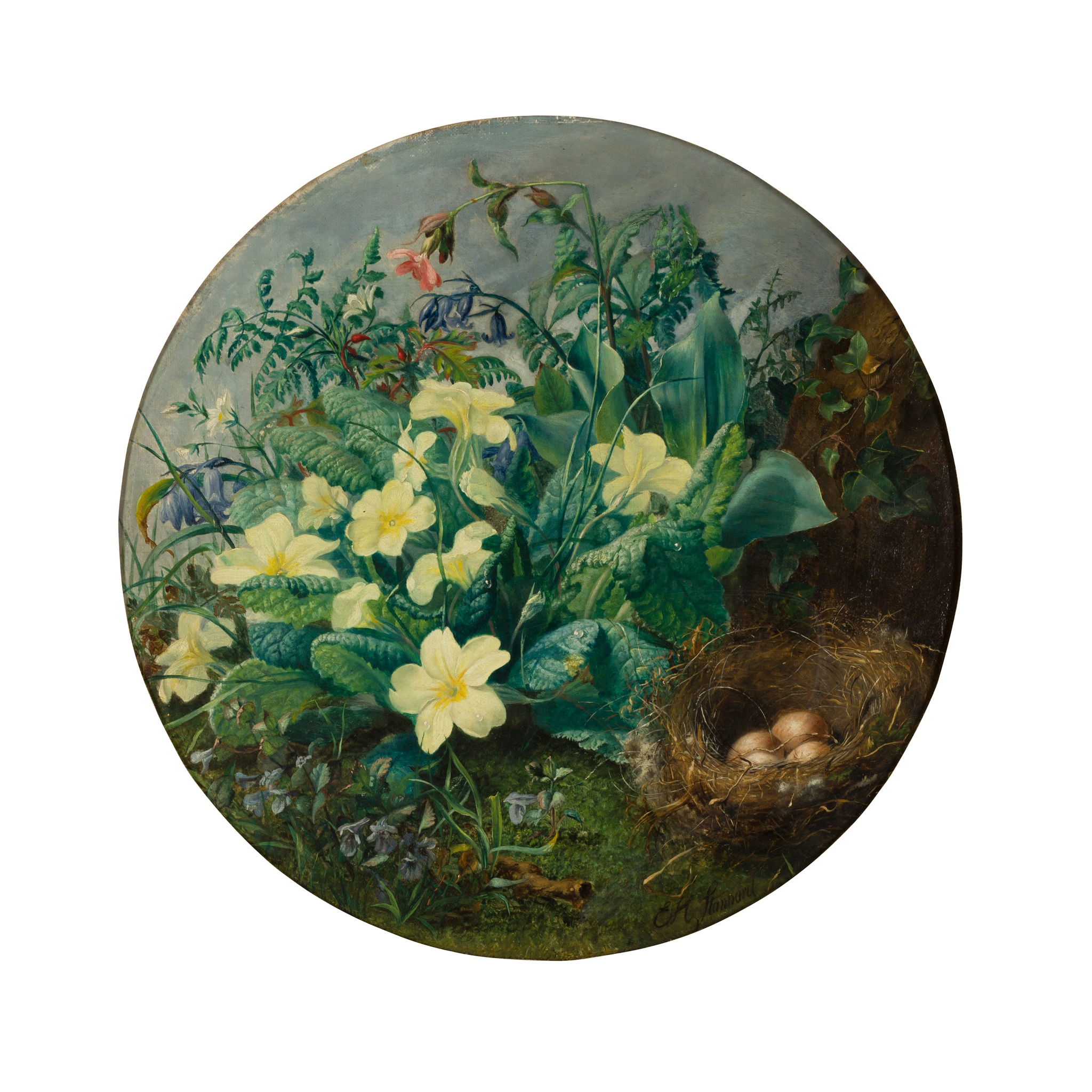
ELOISE HARRIET STANNARD (BRITISH 1829-1915) WILD FLOWERS AND BIRD'S NEST Signed, oil on canvas.
