= Alfred Stannard =

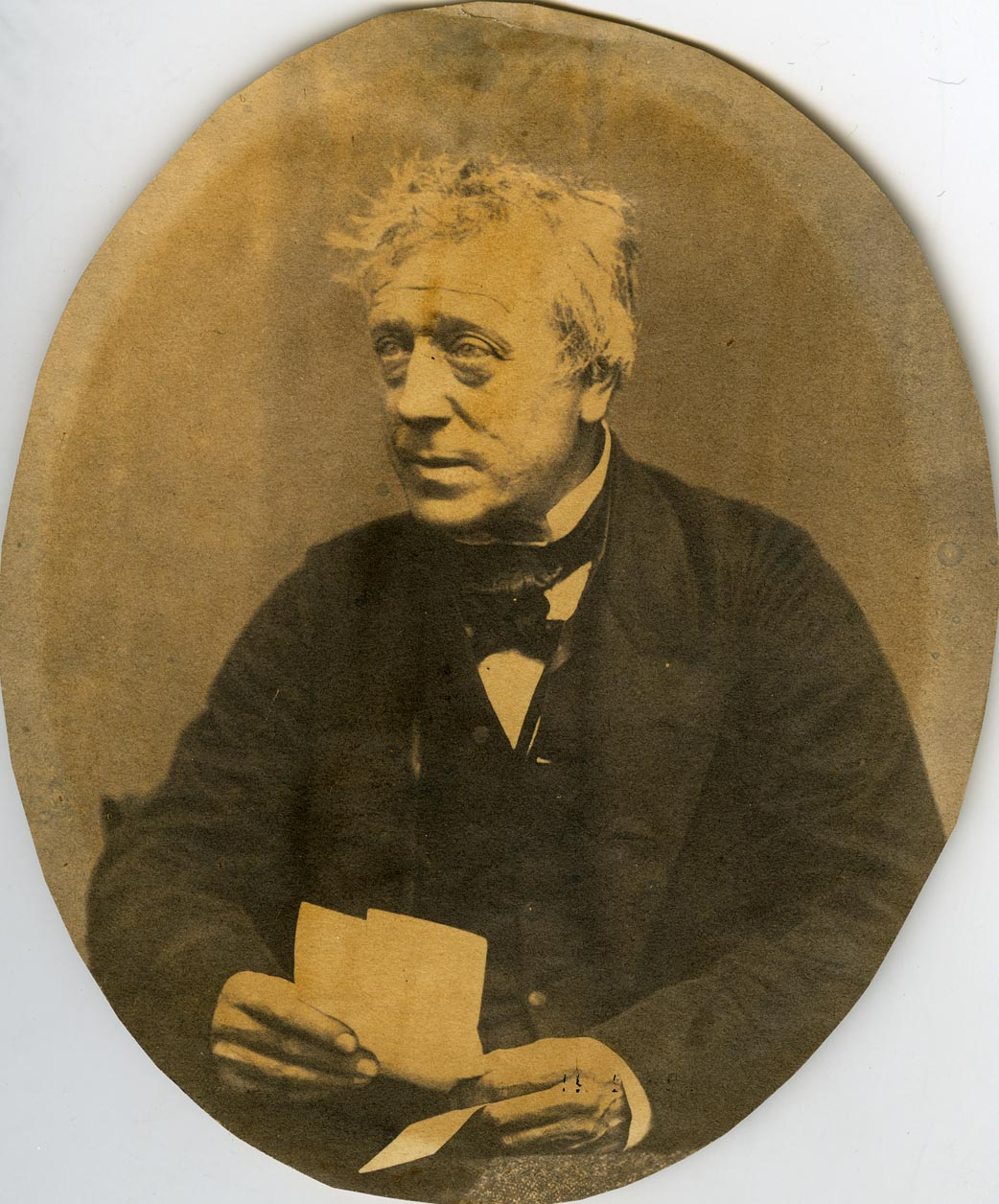
- Born: 14 June 1806
- Died: 1889
- Known for: Landscape painting
- Movement: Norwich School of painters

Alfred Stannard (1806–1889) was an English landscape painter and a member of the Norwich School of painters. His daughter was Eloise Harriet Stannard, a notable artist in her own right.

== Life ==
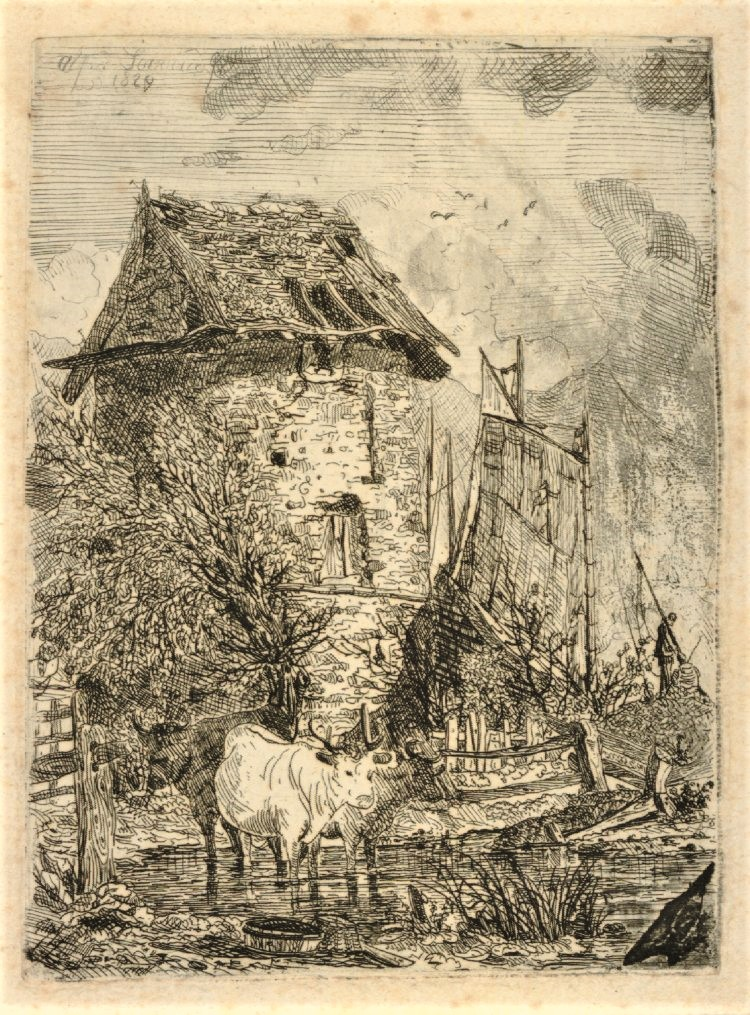
Etching by Alfred Stannard (1829), British Museum

Stannard was born on 14 June 1806, the son of Abraham Stannard and his wife Mary (née Bell), and was baptised in June 1807 at St Andrew's Church, Norwich nine years after the birth of his brother Joseph Stannard, with whom he collaborated as an artist. He first exhibited in 1820.

== Bibliography ==
- Walpole, Josephine (1997). Art and Artists of the Norwich School. Woodbridge: Antique Collectors' Club. ISBN 1-85149-261-5.
