= Henry Ninham =

English landscape artist, engraver, and heraldic painter

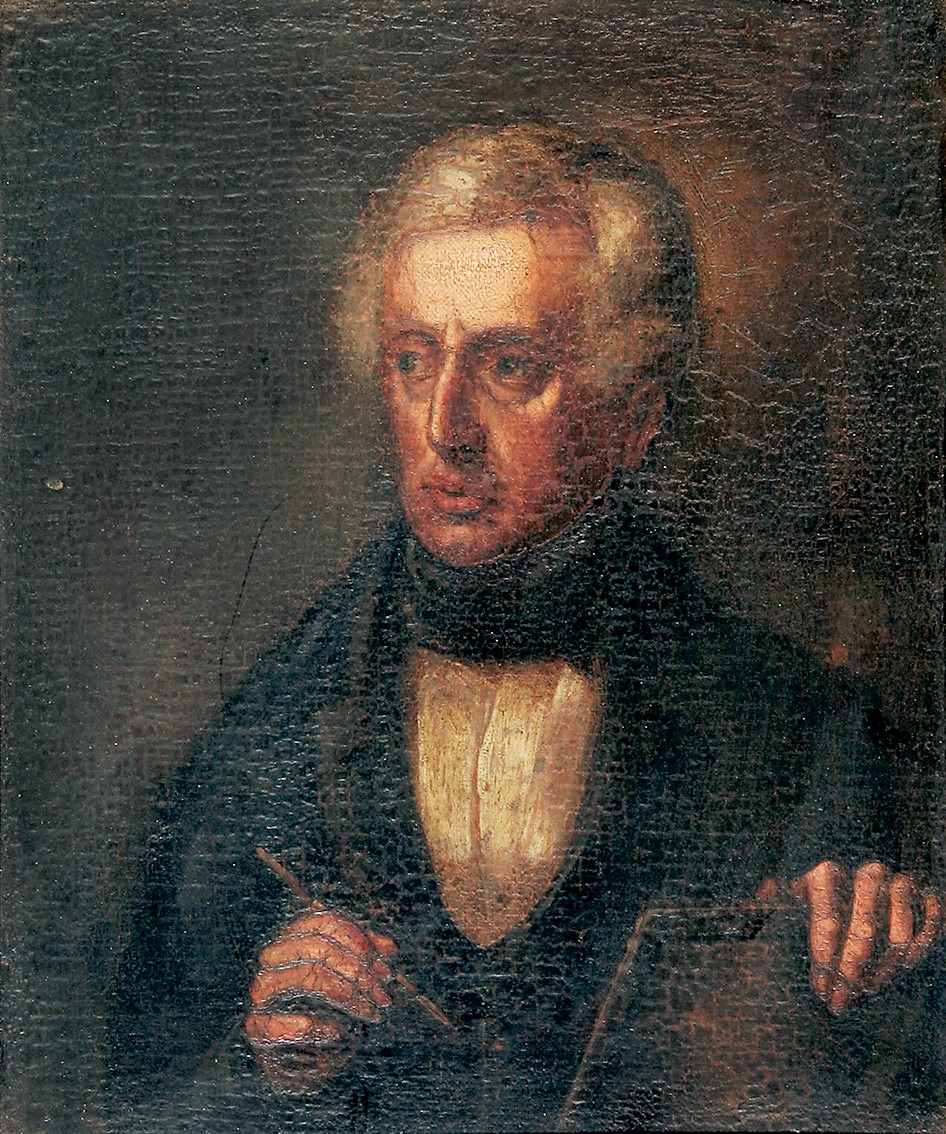
- Portrait by Anthony Sands (undated)
- Born: 15 October 1796; Norwich, England
- Died: 23 October 1874 (aged 78); Norwich, England
- Known for: Landscape painting, engraving and printmaking
- Movement: Norwich School of painters
- Spouse: Elizabeth Wine
- Elected: member of the Norwich Society of Artists
- Memorials: Plaque outside the family house on Chapel Field North, Norwich

Henry Ninham (15 October 1796 – 23 October 1874) was an English landscape artist, engraver and heraldic painter. He and his father John Ninham belonged to the Norwich School of painters, a group of artists who all worked or lived in Norwich during all or part of their working lives from around 1800 to 1880. Along with the Norwich School artists John Thirtle and David Hodgson, he was the foremost recorder of Norwich's architectural heritage prior to the invention of photography.

The son of John Ninham, one of the Norwich School's founding members, Ninham trained as a panel painter under his father and was taught art by John Crome. Throughout much of his adult life, he was directly involved in running the family printing business in Chapelfield Lane, Norwich. After a largely uneventful life, he died in Norwich in 1874.

Ninham rarely travelled far from home to find new subjects. A skilled engraver, his works have provided historians with invaluable information regarding the appearance of many of Norwich's streets and medieval, Tudor and Georgian buildings prior to their demolition.

== Background ==
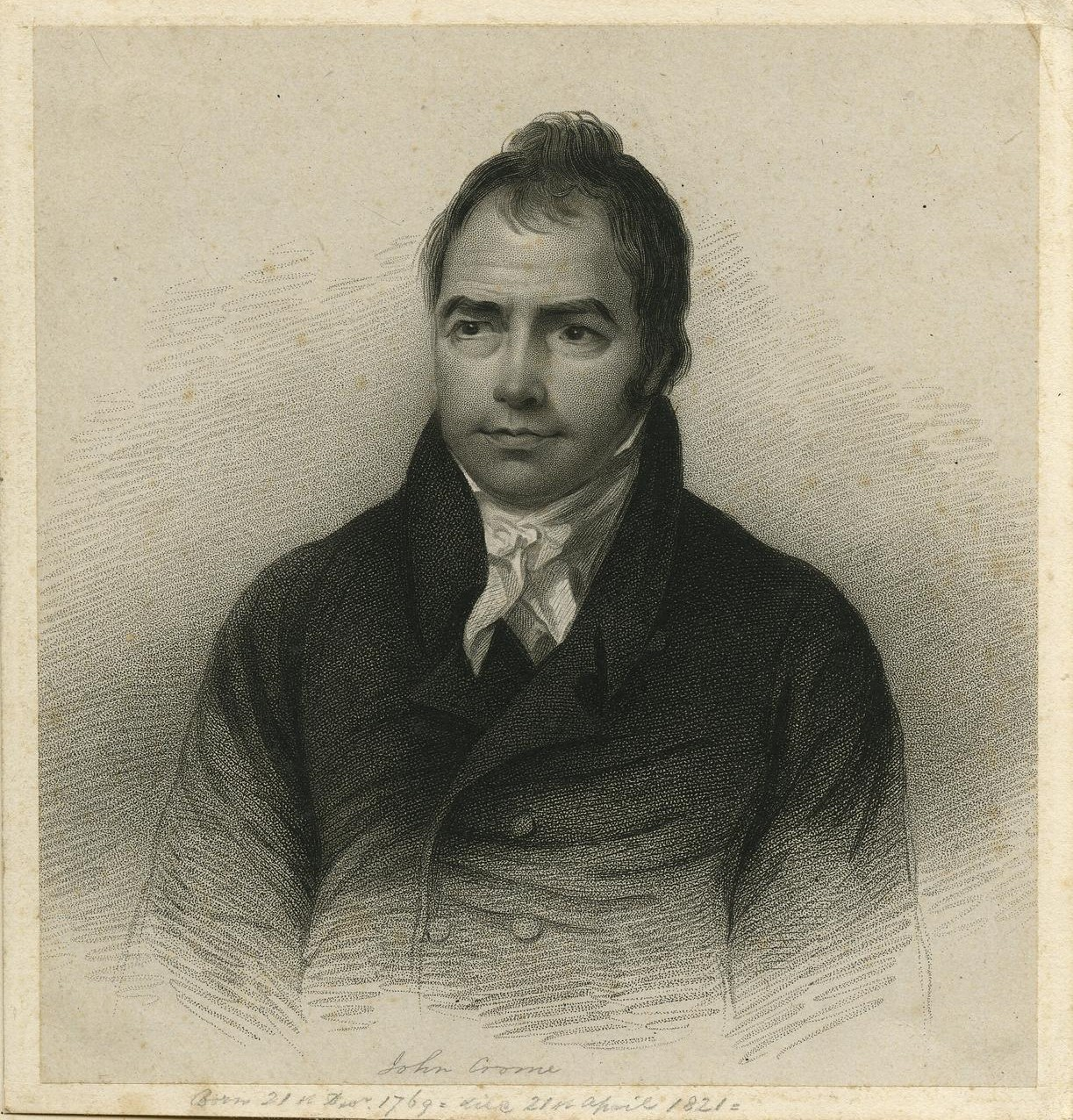
The artist John Crome, whose pupils included Ninham. Crome was the founder of the Norwich School of painters.

The Norwich School of painters, which included Ninham, was a group connected by geographical location, the depiction of Norwich and rural Norfolk, and by close personal and professional relationships. The school's most important artists were John Crome, Joseph Stannard, George Vincent, Robert Ladbrooke, James Stark, John Thirtle and John Sell Cotman, along with Cotman's sons Miles Edmund and John Joseph Cotman. The Norwich School was a unique phenomenon in the history of 19th-century British art. Norwich was the first English city outside London where a school of artists arose, and had more local-born artists than any subsequently-formed schools elsewhere. Norwich's theatrical, artistic, philosophical and musical cultures were cross-fertilised in a way that was unique outside London.

Within the Norwich School was the Norwich Society of Artists, founded in 1803, which arose from the need for a group of Norwich artists to teach each other and their pupils. As was the case with Ninham, not all of the members of the Norwich School were also members of the Norwich Society, which held regular exhibitions and had an organised structure, showing works annually until 1825 and again from 1828. The Society was dissolved in 1833. It was entirely because of John Sell Cotman and John Crome—who was the Society's leading spirit—that it achieved the success that it did.

The impact of the Norwich School outside East Anglia was based largely upon the works of Vincent and Stark, who were seen as important members of the second generation of the school, and whose exhibited paintings in the capital attracted much praise in the London press. Interest in paintings by the Norwich School declined during the 1830s, but the school's reputation rose after the Royal Academy's 1878 Winter Exhibition. By the end of the century, however, its paintings, which had once been regarded as modern and progressive, were seen as belonging to a bygone age. This has been attributed by the Professor Andrew Hemingway to the "mythology of rural Englishness" that prevailed at the start of the 20th century.

== Family ==
The surname Ninham originates either from the Middle English innom ('enclosed ground'), or from an unidentified minor placename in southern England, such as Inholmes, in Sussex. The art historian William Dickes, writing in 1905, believed Henry Ninham's grandfather was a Huguenot who came to England from Flanders following the revocation of the 1598 Edict of Nantes in 1685.

=== John Ninham ===
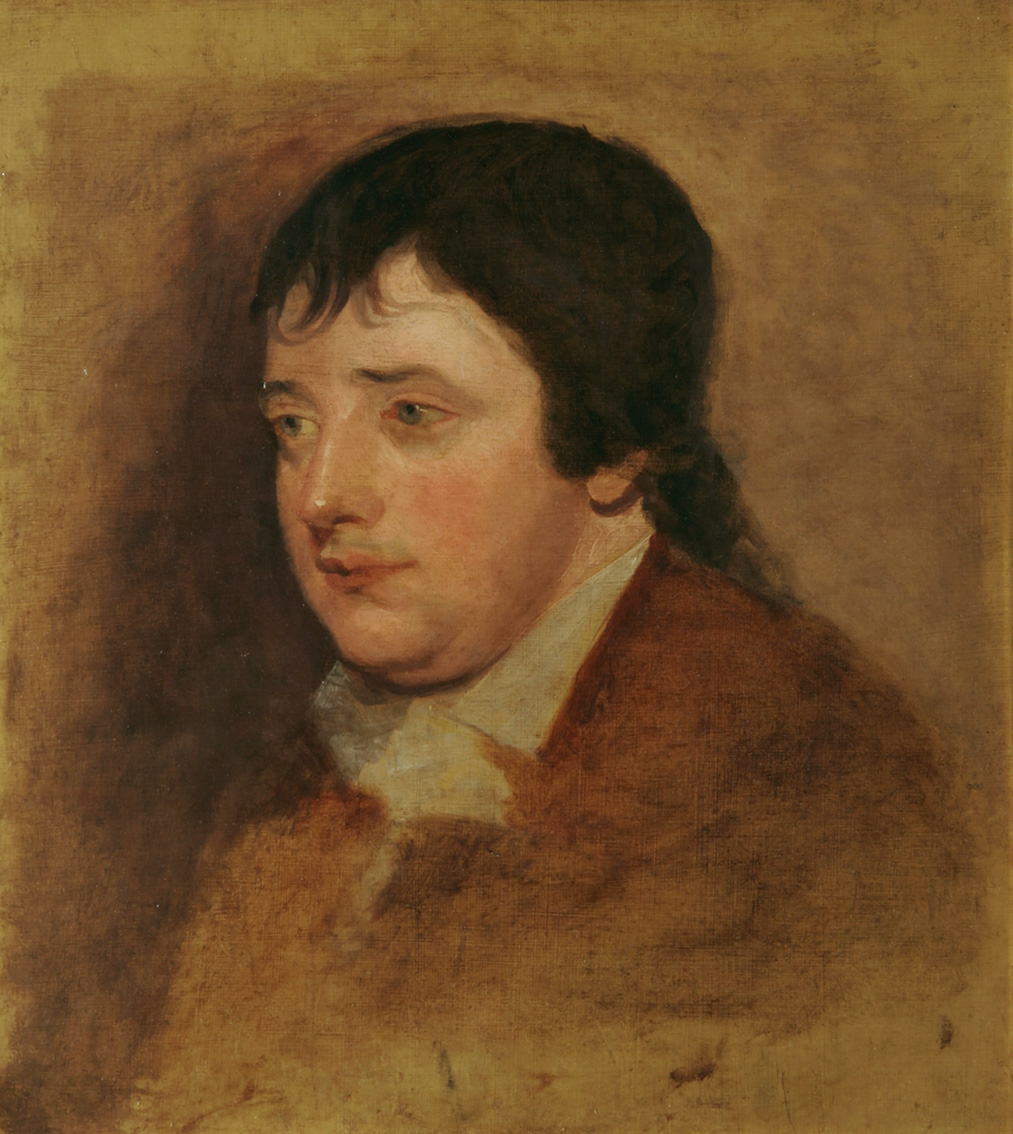
Portrait of John Ninham (Norfolk Museums Collections)

Henry Ninham's father John was born in Norwich in about 1754. (Note: A child named Jonathan Ninham, who was born on 23 March 1753 and baptised two days later, was the son of John and Jane Ninham, both of the parish of St Michael Coslany, Norwich.) He probably never received any formal education and was indentured to an unknown master as a heraldic painter and an engraver. He lived and worked at 11, Chapel Field, where he specialised in painting coach panels, in common with his contemporary John Crome. He married Elizabeth Wine on 12 June 1774.

John Ninham is the least well known of Crome's contemporaries and few works have been attributed to him. His Beach Scene, painted in the 1760s, is considered by the historian Andrew Moore to have been important in establishing his artistic style. Ninham's series of eleven India ink drawings of the city gates of Norwich were produced in 1792–1793, and were included in Robert Fitch's Views of the Gates of Norwich made in the years 1792-3 by the Late John Ninham (1861). The drawings, produced using a camera obscura, are of interest to historians as they were made just before the gates were demolished by the city authorities. John Ninham is considered to belong to the Norwich School of painters, but unlike many of the artists of the Norwich School, he was neither a member of the Norfolk and Norwich Society of Artists, nor did he exhibit there. His works were shown at the Norfolk and Suffolk Institution for the Promotion of the Fine Arts in 1831, and at the Norfolk and Norwich Fine Arts Exhibition in 1860.

John Ninham died in Norwich on 16 August 1817, his obituary being published in the Norfolk Chronicle the following week. His heraldic and printing business was taken over by his sons Henry and Thomas. (Note: John Ninham's short obituary read, At his house in Chapel-field, Mr. John Ninham, aged 63, sincerely lamented by his widow and eight children, to whom he was an affectionate husband and father. To speak of him as an artist, it is but justice to say, that very few, without the advantages of education, will be found to have exceeded him in the theoretical as well as practical part of design, painting, sculpture, and engraving. A large family, and an insatiable thirst after knowledge, prevented his advancement in life, in least with that degree which his family and friends might have hoped for, from his universal knowledge and laborious life; but for strict honesty, and well meaning, those who knew him the best will give him the most credit. His business will be carried on by his sons. (Norfolk Chronicle, 23 August 1817, p. 28.).)

== Life ==
=== Early life ===
According to the parish records for St Stephen's Church, Norwich, Henry Ninham was born in Norwich on 15 October 1796 and was baptised on 23 October, the son of John and his wife Elizabeth Wine, and one of eight children. Nothing is known of his boyhood. He lived at 11, Chapelfield Lane, where his father ran a small copperplate printing firm. He trained under his father as an apprentice engraver and a heraldic painter, and was taught art by John Crome, who influenced his use of soft greys and pinks in his palette. As a skilled engraver Ninham was capable, according to the author William Dickes, of producing a miniature image of a peacock that was so detailed that individual feathers could be seen with the aid of a magnifying glass.

=== Artistic career ===
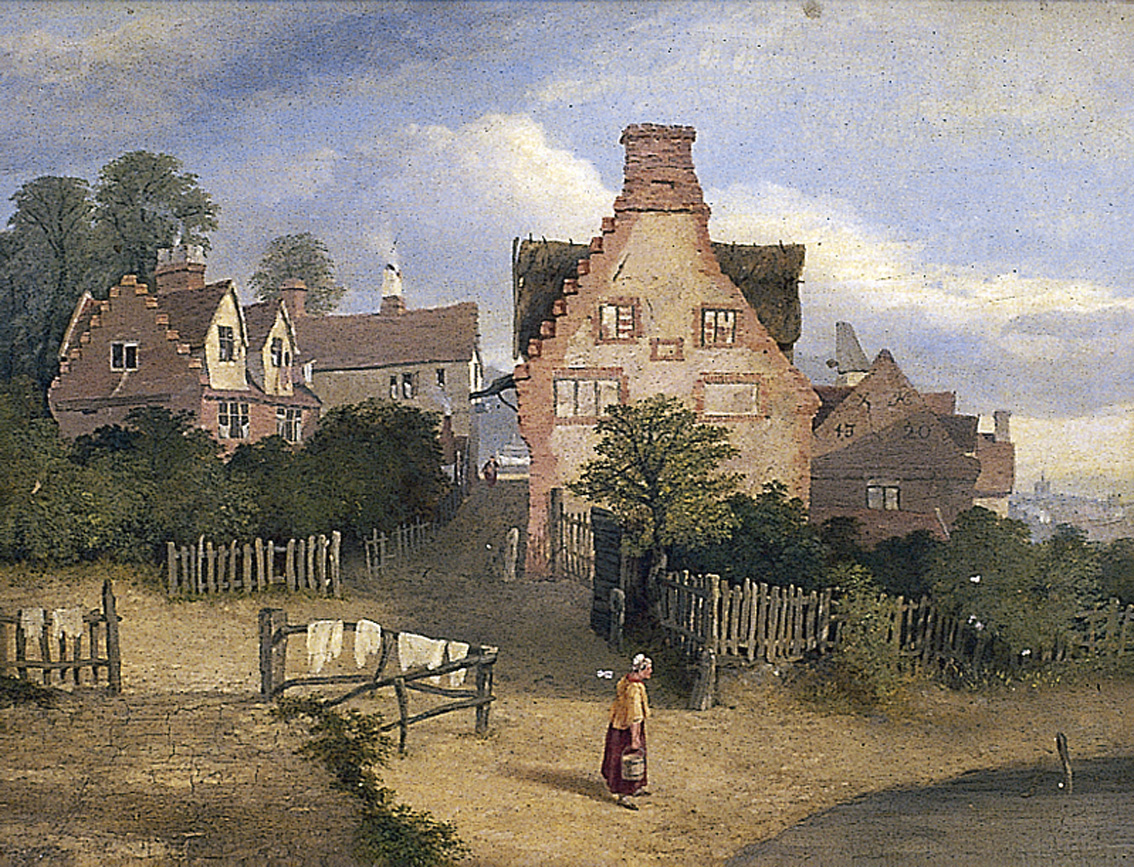
Fuller's House, St Martin's, Norwich (undated), Norfolk Museums Collections

Henry Ninham is considered by the author Harold Day to be a minor artist. He began to exhibit after 1815, when he was in his early twenties. Over a period of fifteen years, each year from 1816–20 and afterwards in 1824, 1830 and 1831, he exhibited only sixteen paintings at the annual exhibitions of the Norwich Society of Artists, mostly of architectural subjects.

He produced few watercolours, those he made being mainly reproductions of his oil paintings. The prints he made are notable for being of a new kind for their time, depicting humble cottages rather than grand buildings and churches. They usually featured the buildings of Norwich or its neighbouring villages, as Ninham rarely travelled away from home. One drawing he produced, of Sir Benjamin Wrench's Court (an etching now with Norfolk Museums Collections), is of importance for depicting the location of the Norwich Society of Artists' exhibitions from 1803 to 1825. The quality of Ninham's prints rivalled those made by John Sell Cotman and show a spontaneity and originality resulting from him having complete control over the engraving and printing processes. He may have worked with Robert Leman, with the artists using the backs of each other's plates. He made good quality lithographs on an occasional basis. He was responsible for the preparation of the plates for John Crome's posthumous exhibition of works in 1834, which were later spoilt after attempts were made to restore the quality of the original plates, a problem that Ninham was painfully aware of.

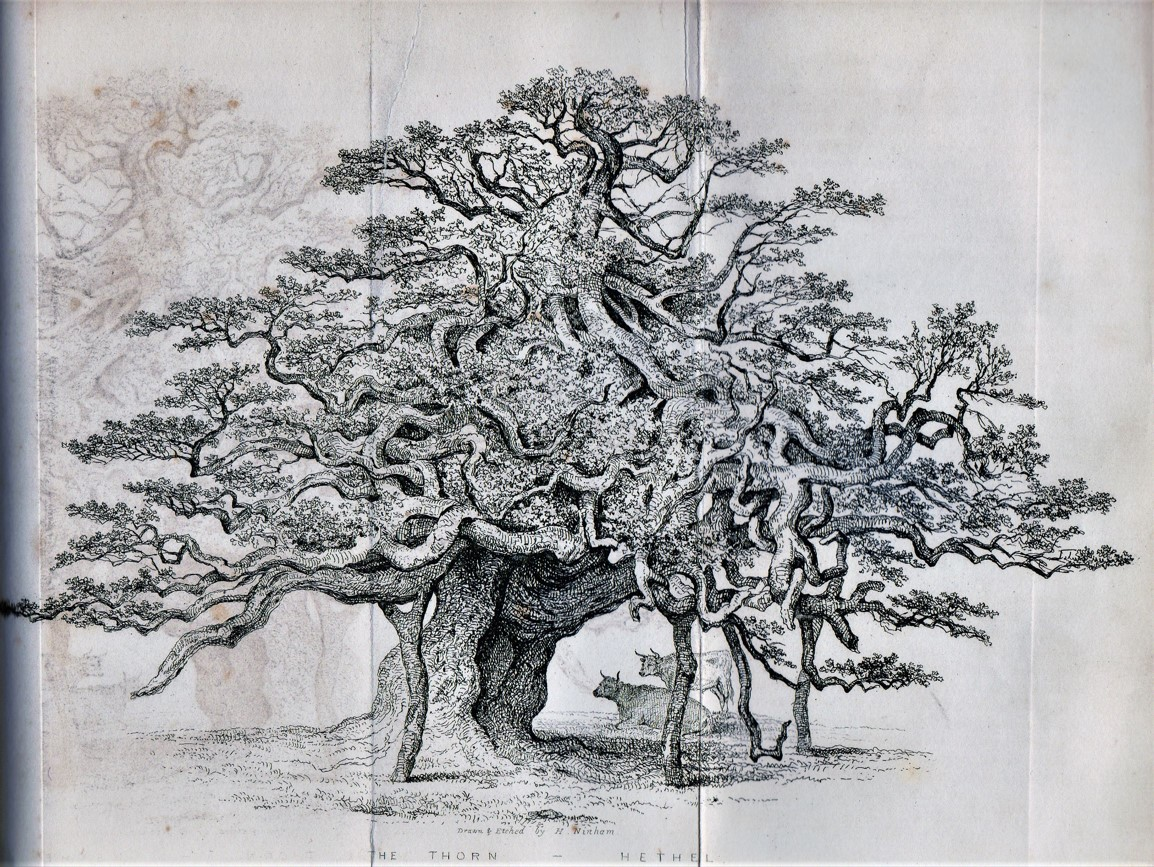
The Thorn - Hethel from The Eastern Arboretum (1841)

Ninham collaborated in the production of a number of books and academic journals. A notable example, The Eastern Arboretum (1841), included The Thorn - Hethel, his illustration of the ancient tree growing south-west of Norwich near to the church at Hethel. (Note: The hawthorn tree known as the Hethel Thorn still exists. One of the oldest of its species growing in the UK, it is reputed to be over 700 years old.) His illustrations for Views of the Ancient Gates of Norwich, which described the city gates prior to their removal between 1792-5 and 1807-8, have been described by the author Geoffrey Searle as examples of his most characteristic plates.

He was a friend of the Reverend Edward Thomas Daniell, a landscape painter and etcher who grew up in Norfolk. Daniell was licensed in 1832 as the curate of Banham, and lived there until in 1834 he was appointed to the curacy of St. Mark's, North Audley Street in London. He lived in London until 1840. That year, inspired by the Scottish painter David Roberts, he began a tour of the Near East. During his travels he visited Adelia (now known as Antalya), during which time he contracted malaria and died. Ninham was introduced to J. M. W. Turner by Daniell, was influenced by his use of drypoint, and, according to a letter Daniell sent him in April 1835, may have produced his plates. Together they made etchings of the keep of Norwich Castle, recording the outer decoration prior to its restoration, with Ninham sending his friend news about the controversial restoration whilst Daniell was living in London. Their surviving correspondence is now kept in the British Museum.

Ninham had pupils, including the landscape painter Alfred Priest, whose early works were strongly influenced by his teacher. He taught perspective drawing and copperplate engraving to supplement the income generated from his heraldic painting and engraving business.

=== Family life ===
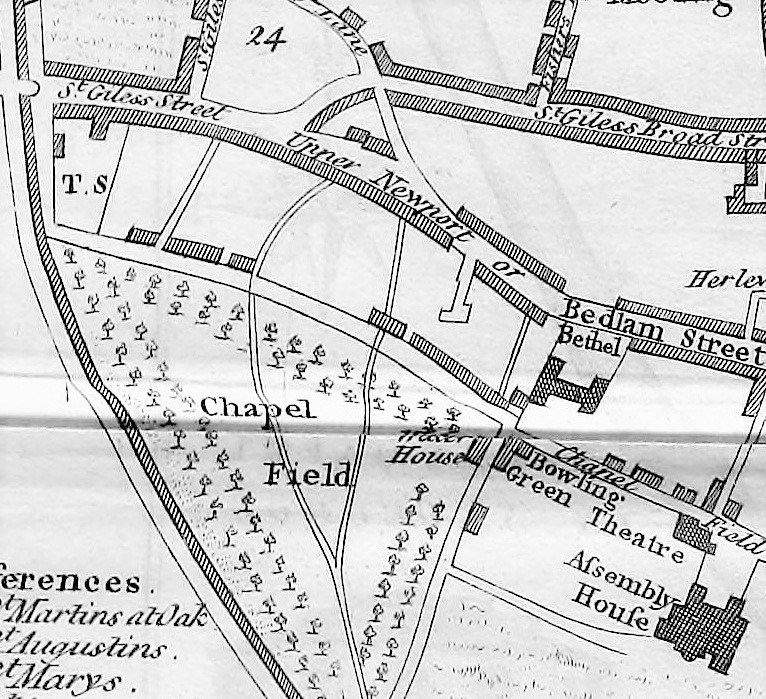
Chapel Field, from a 1781 map of Norwich.

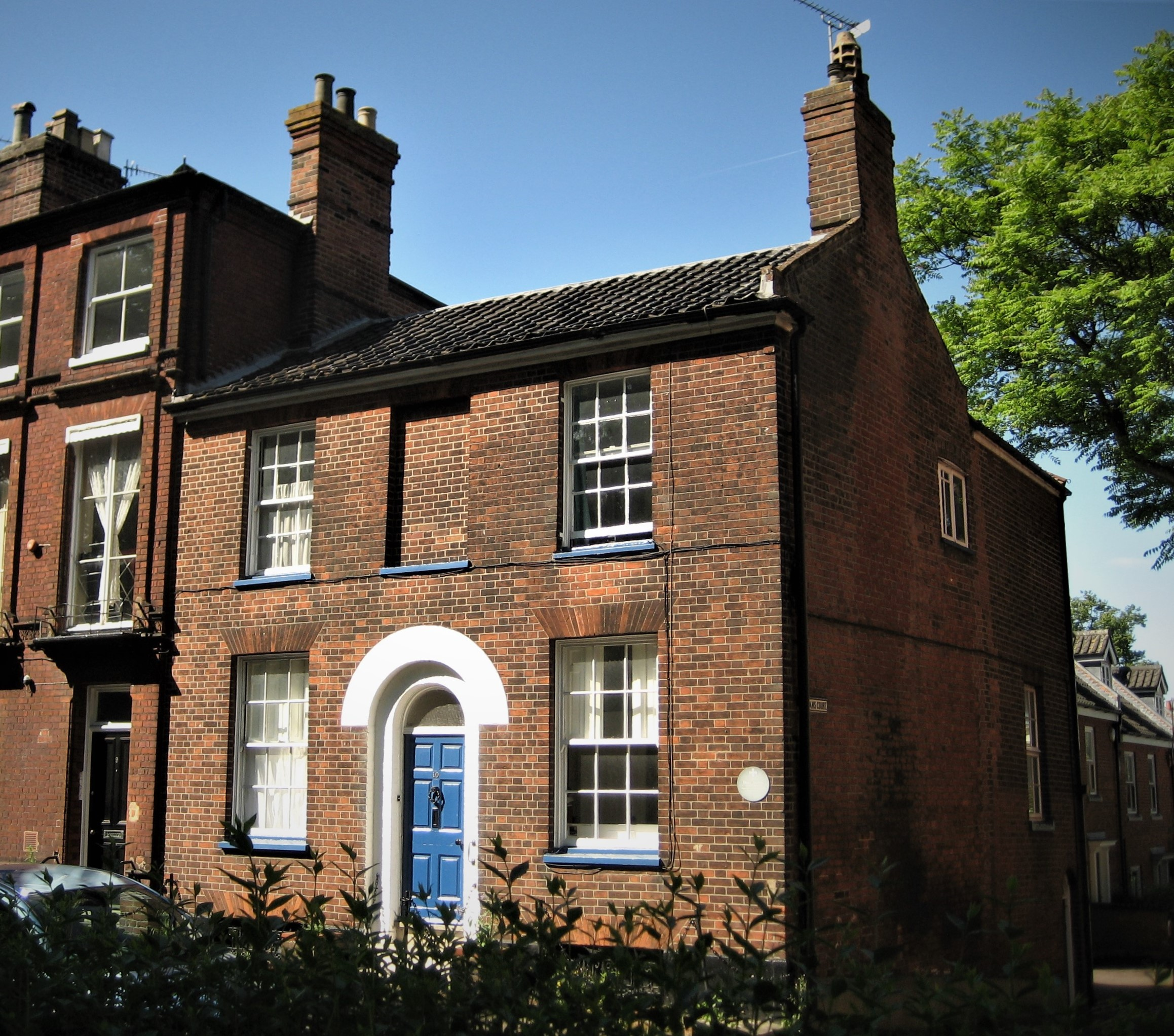
Ninham's house on Chapel Field North

Henry Ninham was described by contemporaries as being kind-hearted, of average height, but rather heavy and stout. He led a regular and uneventful life, but his daughter Frances Elizabeth died aged 24 in 1855, his wife Frances having died in 1845. He lived all his life in the same house. The family employed a servant, Susan Bangay (born around 1831), who lived with the Ninhams for over twenty years, and who supported Henry in his old age.

A widower for thirty years, Ninham continued working up to his death, which occurred at his home on 23 October 1874. He was 78. His obituary, written by James Reeve, the curator of the Norwich Museum, appeared in the Norfolk Chronicle on 31 October.

== Reputation and legacy ==
Henry Ninham did not publicise himself much as an artist, preferring for instance to advertise as a 'Teacher of Perspective' in exhibition catalogues. During the 1830s he gained a reputation for the quality of his engravings and etchings, and he became an important figure in the Norwich printmaking scene. In time his limited range of subjects and lack of any connections outside Norwich caused his reputation to become limited.

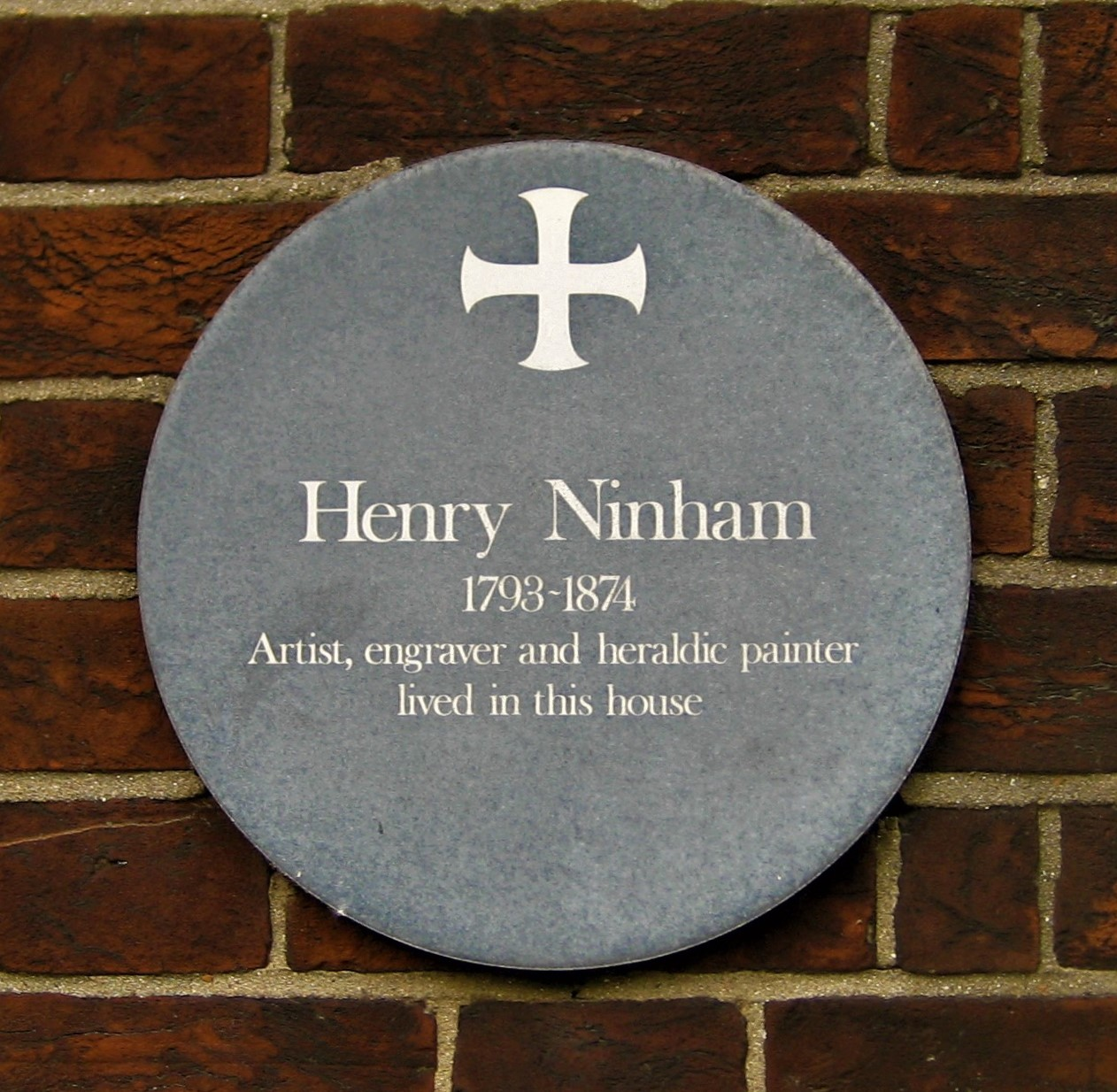
Henry Ninham's plaque in Norwich

He was thought highly of by the artist John Sell Cotman, who called him "a very clever painter". His works only attracted occasional interest in the local press, for instance when he was noted for his accurate and precise draughtsmanship by the Norwich Mercury, in an article dated 14 August 1824, which praised the "neat delineation" of his engravings. Following the announcement of his death in 1874, the Norfolk News wrote: "Mr. Ninham was at all times ready to impart his knowledge to others, and his kind and genial manner will, apart from his artistic abilities, cause him to be long remembered by all who had the pleasure of his acquaintance".

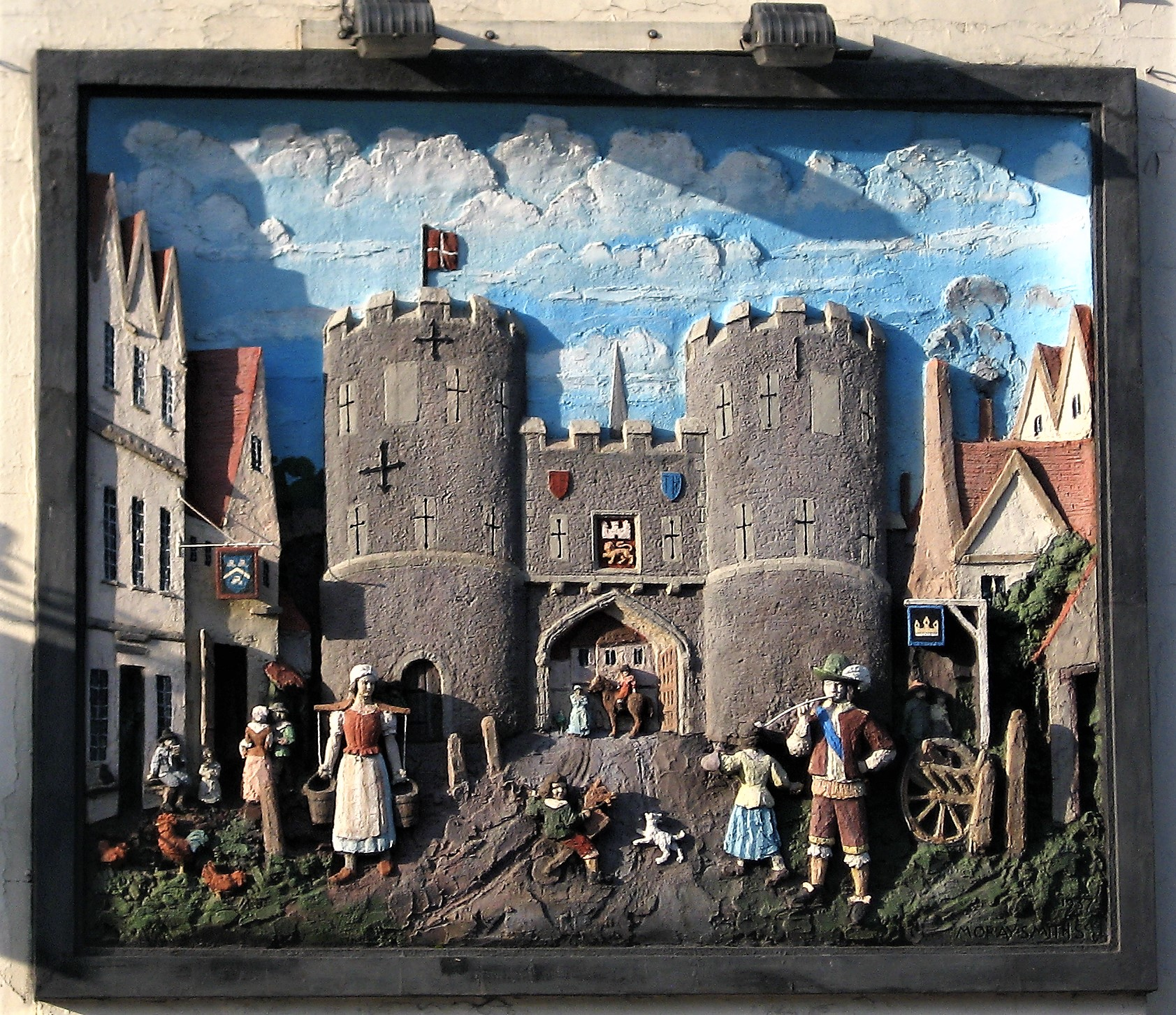
John Moray-Smith, Needham Gate (1937)

The art historian Harold Day, writing in the 1960s, described Ninham as having a "pleasing painter with a delicate sense of colour and a controlled touch", and the art historian Josephine Walpole regards Ninham as more naturally talented than his father.

He is recognised along with David Hodgson as the foremost recorder of Norwich's buildings from the 1840s. They sometimes etched the same buildings, as with the now demolished Sir Benjamin Wrenches Court, but Hodgson tended to be more interested in depicting ruins than his contemporary. Their views of Norwich have provided historians with a valuable and accurate record of the city's streets, as many buildings that they knew have since disappeared. The antiquary Dawson Turner, in attempting to produce a record of Norfolk’s architectural heritage, commissioned artists to illustrate Francis Blomefield’s History of Norfolk. He paid particular tribute to Ninham, who lent him many drawings to be copied.

Several of Ninham's paintings have been sold at auction in recent years. Bishop’s Bridge, Norwich, which was sold in 2018, fetched £440 at Keys Auctions in Aylsham, Norfolk, a pair of watercolours Old Post Office Court, Norwich 1826 was sold at auction in 2011 by Bonhams for £1.375, and £290 was fetched in 2017 for A Doorway.

In 1937 the artist John Moray-Smith produced seven murals for display on the sides of pubs, each depicting one of the city's gates and closely following engravings by Ninham. Two of the murals, of the gates at Ber Street and St Stephen's Street, have survived.

== Gallery ==
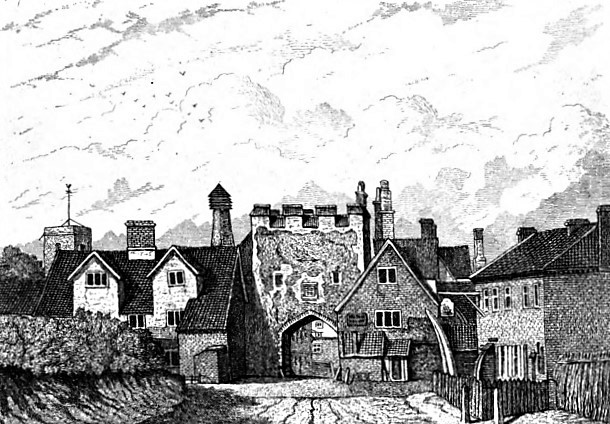
John Ninham, King Street Gate (1793)

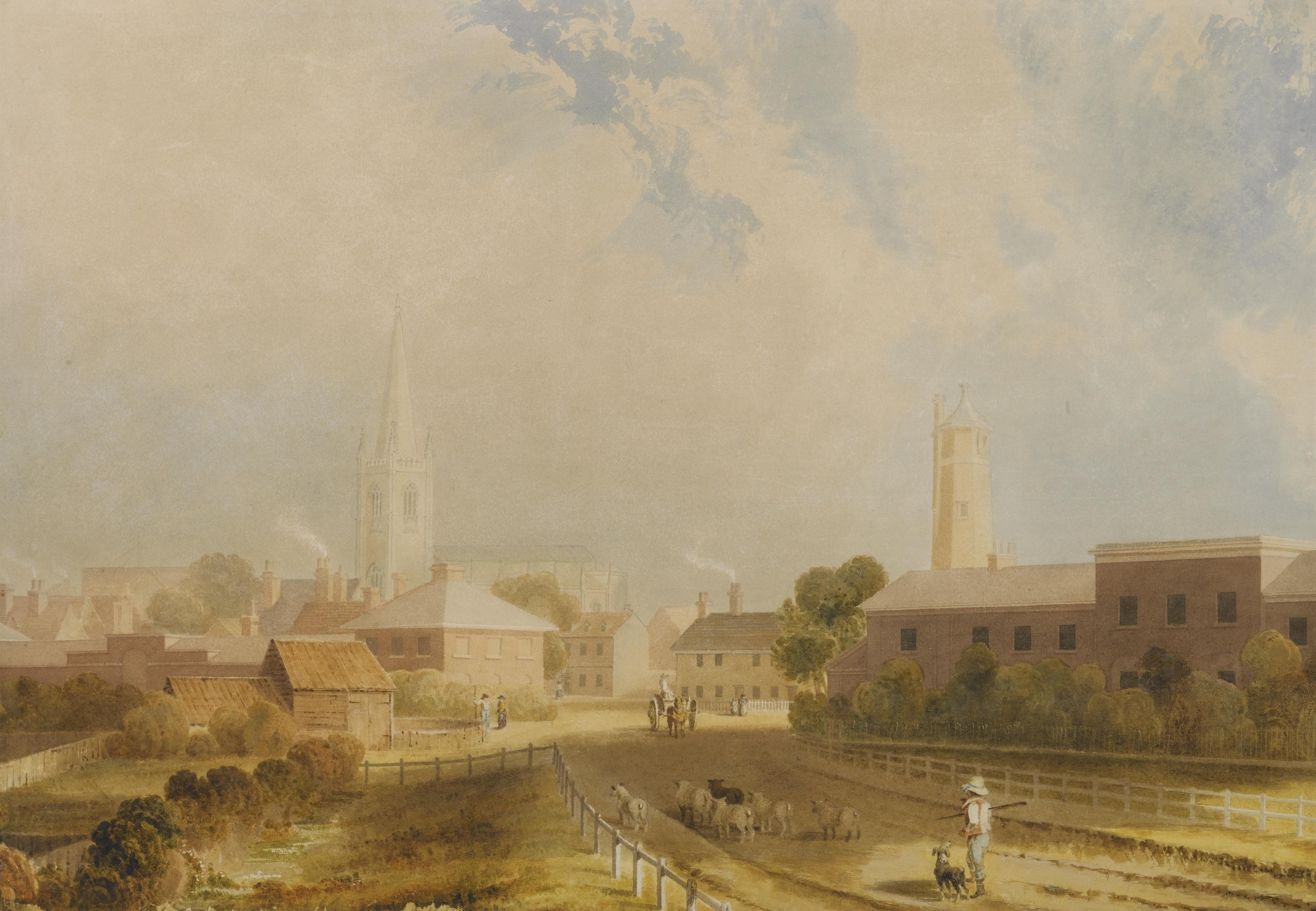
View of Harwich, Essex

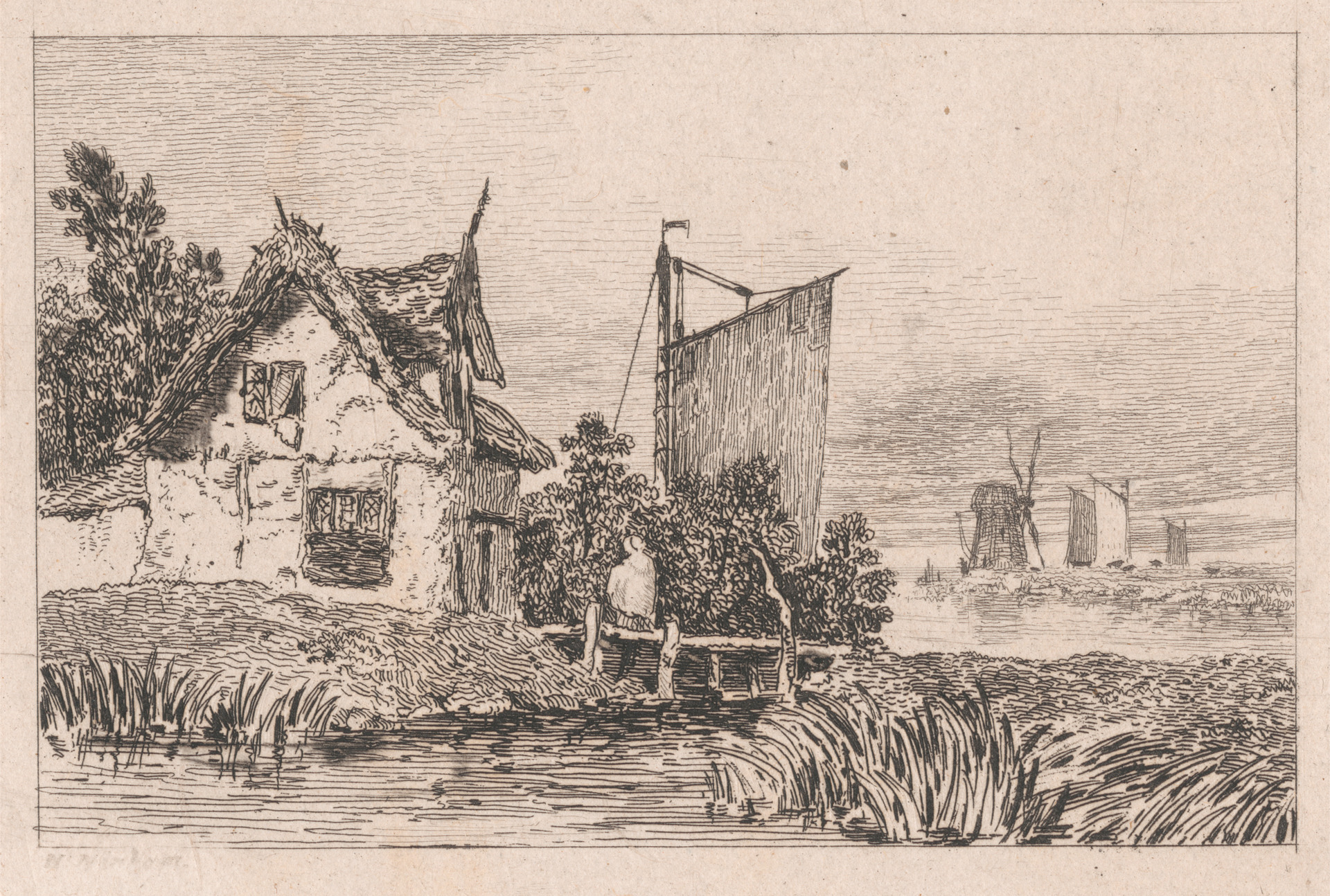
Cottage and River Scene (undated), Yale Center for British Art

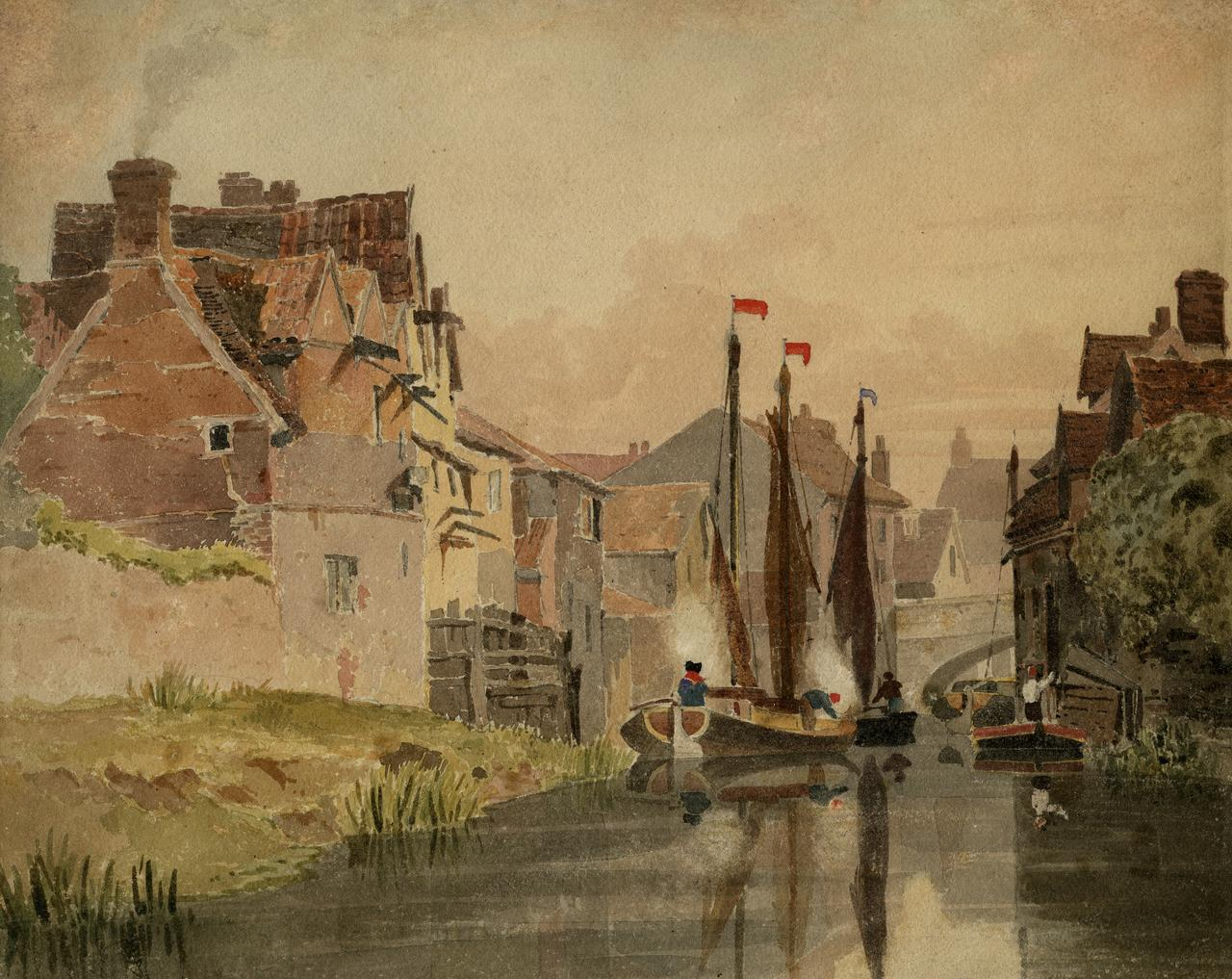
Whitefriars, Norwich (c.1830), Norfolk Museums Collections

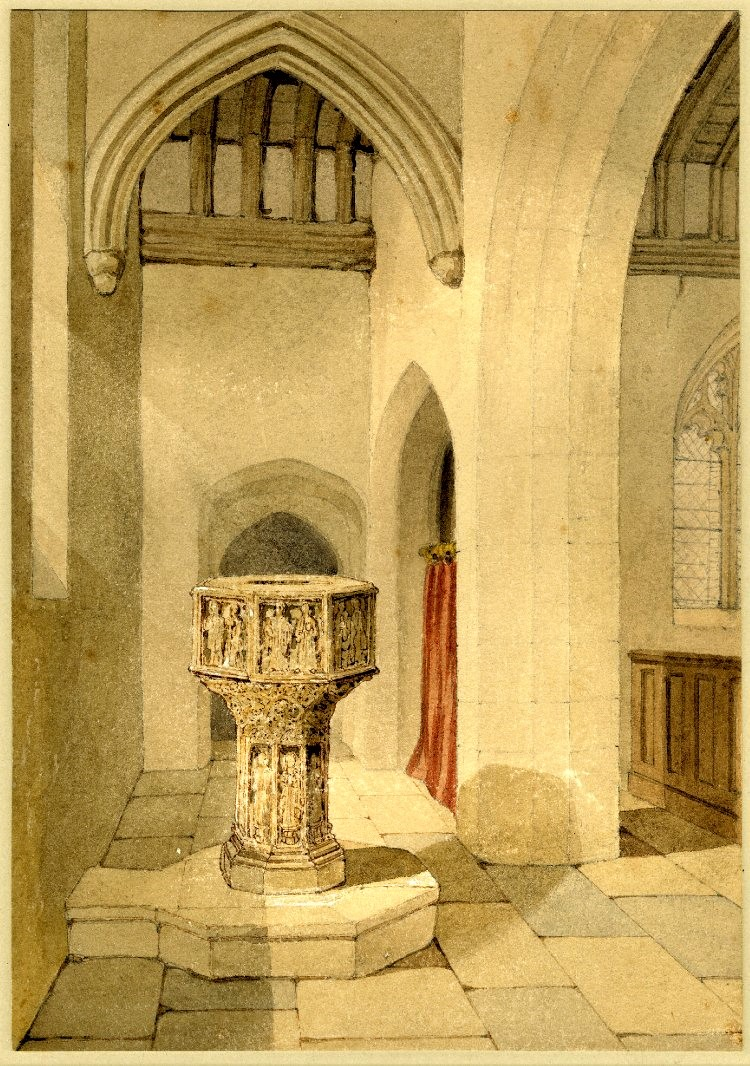
Interior of St. James Norwich (undated), British Museum

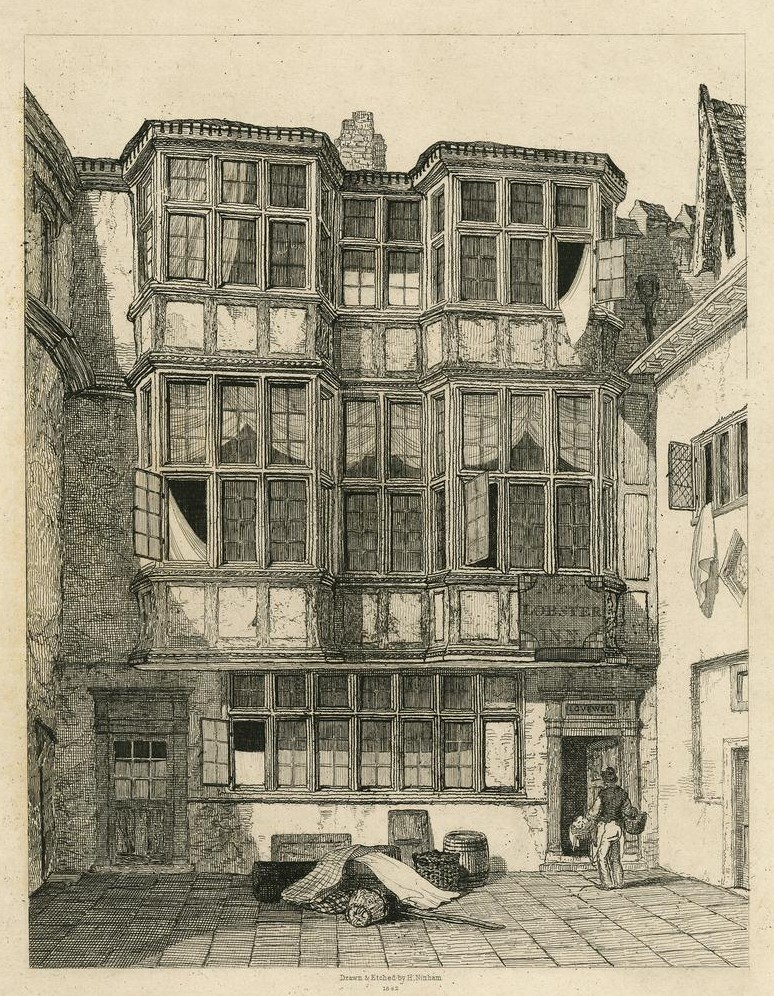
Sir Benjamin Wrenches Court, Norwich (1842), Norfolk Museums Collections

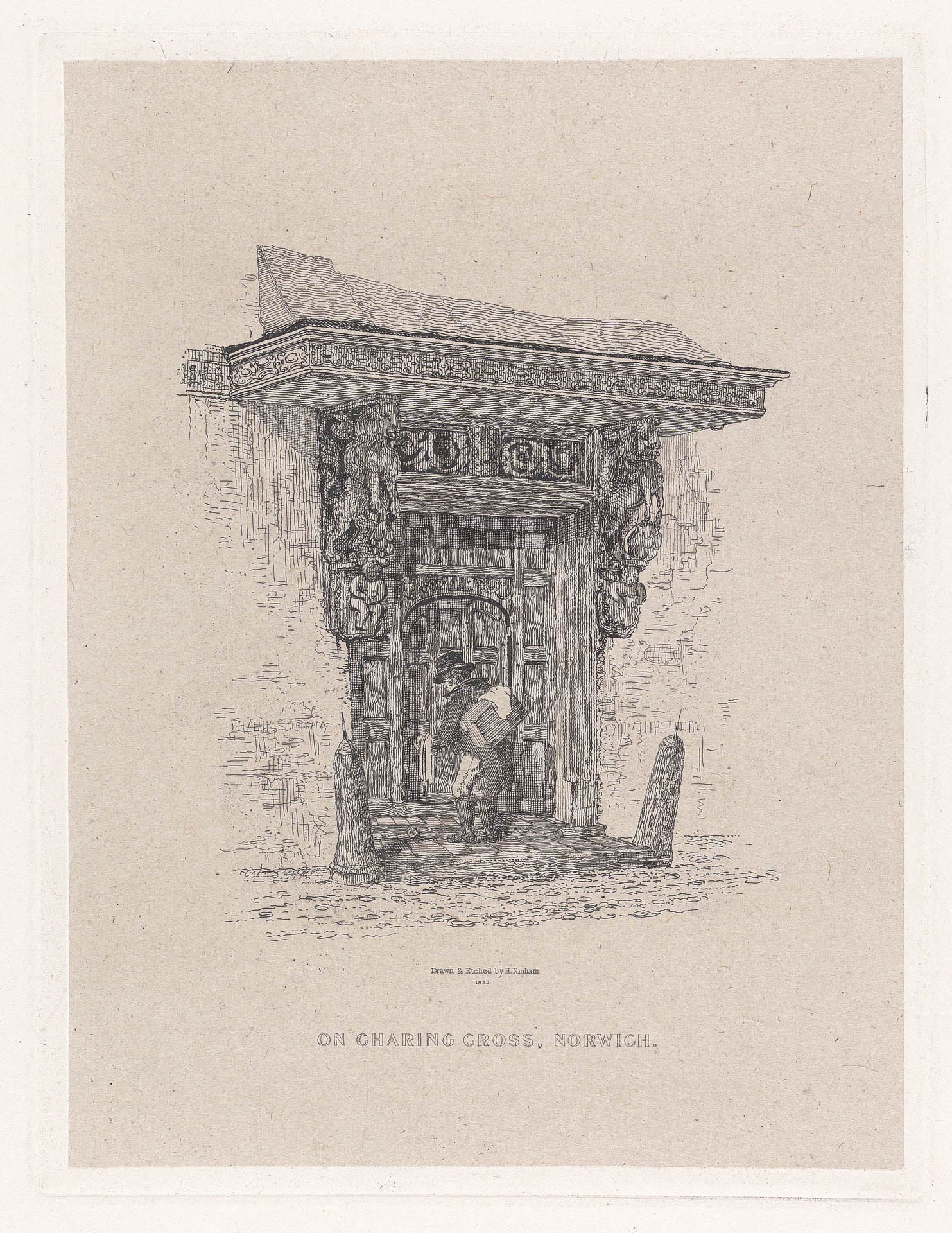
On Charing Cross, Norwich (1842), Yale Center for British Art

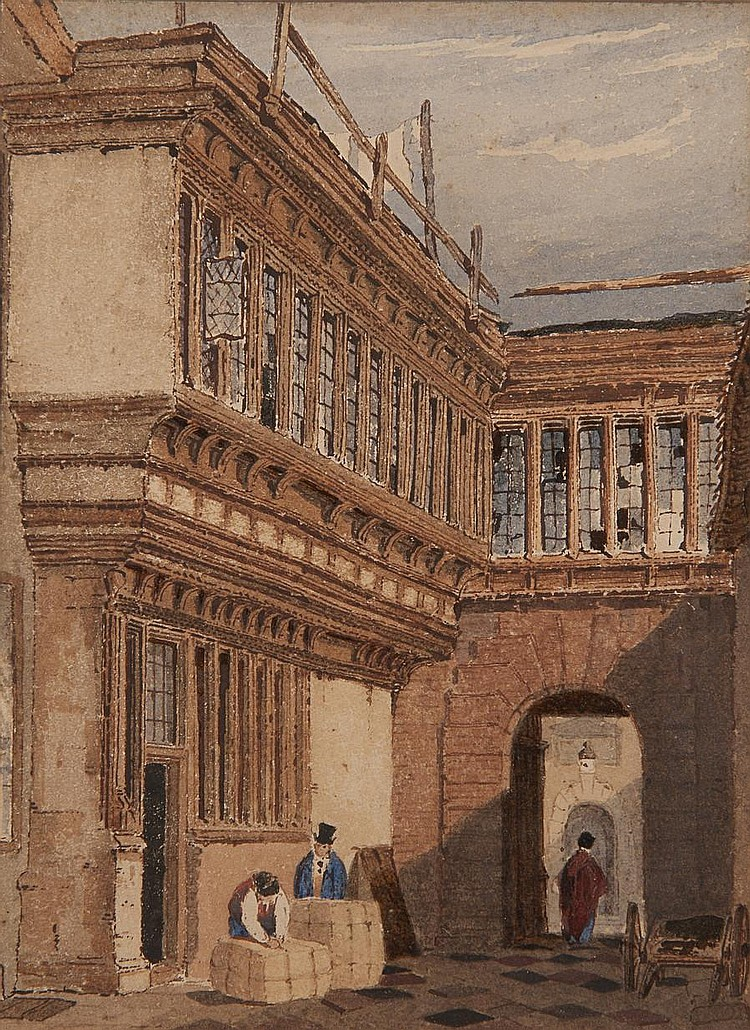
Old Post Office Court, Norwich 1826

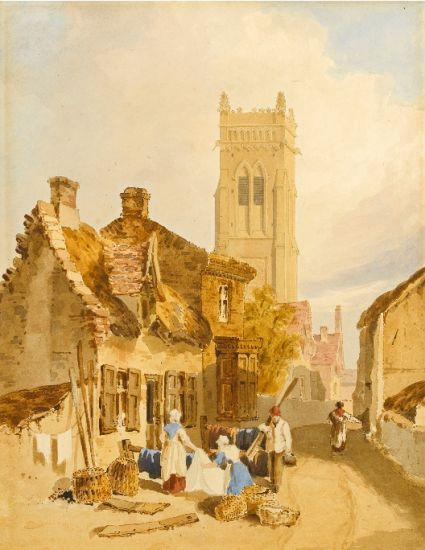
Washing Day, Cromer, Norfolk (1828)

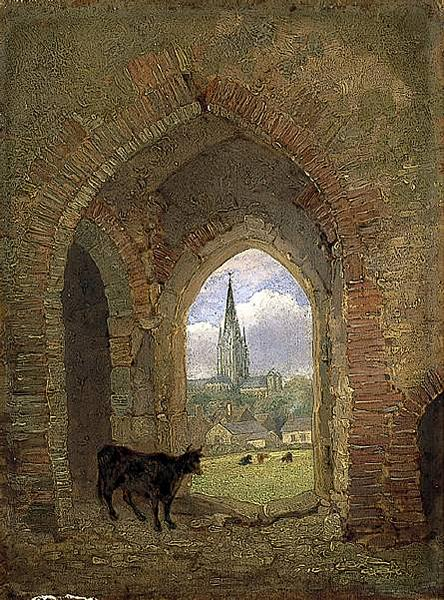
View through the archway of the Cow Tower, Norwich, showing the Dean Meadow (1840), Norwich Guildhall.

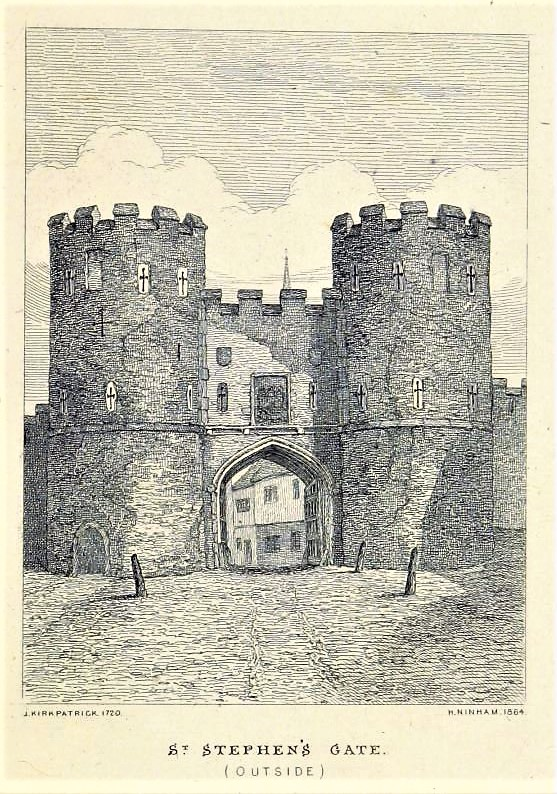
St. Stephen's Gate - outside (1864), British Library

== Published works ==
=== John Ninham ===
- Fitch, Robert (1861). Views of the Gates of Norwich made in the years 1792-3 by the Late John Ninham, with an historical introduction, extracts from the Corporation records and papers of the late John Kirkpatrick. Norwich: Cundall, Miller and Leavins. ISBN 978-1-85149-261-9.

=== Henry Ninham ===
- Barrett, J. T. (1848). Memorials of the parochial church, the collegiate chantry, and the chapel of St Mary in the Parish of Attleborough. Illustrated by Henry Ninham. London: John W. Parker. OCLC 866344596.
- Bloom, Revd. J. H. (1843). Notices, Historical and Antiquarian, of the Castle and Priory at Castleacre, in the County of Norfolk. Illustrated by Henry Ninham, Mr. Sly, and Henry Vizetelly, from drawings by Charles Wright. London: Pelham Richardson. OCLC 693003545.
- Ewing, William Creasy (1850). Notices and Illustrations of the pageantry formerly displayed by the Corporation of Norwich. Charles Muskett. OCLC 21939142.
- Grigor, James (1841). The eastern arboretum, or Register of remarkable trees, seats, gardens, &c. in ... Norfolk. Illustrated by Henry Ninham. London: Longman, Brown, Green, & Longmans. OCLC 551380192.
- Ninham, Henry (1842). Nine Etchings of Picturesque Antiquities in the City of Norwich. OCLC 39629976.
- Ninham, Henry (1875). Fifteen Etchings by the late Henry Ninham (1875). Oxford University.
- Ninham, Henry; Ewing, W. C. (1845). Remnants of Antiquity in Norwich. Norwich: Privately printed for Charles Muskett. OCLC 858594897.
- Richardson, Samuel (1864). Views of the Ancient City Gates of Norwich As they appeared in 1722. Drawn and etched by Henry Ninham, from original sketches by John Kirkpatrick. Norwich: Cundall, Miller & Leavins. OCLC 964347474.
- "Norfolk Archaeology, or Miscellaneous Tracts relating to the Antiquity of the County of Norfolk". Journal of the Norfolk and Norwich Archaeological Society. 1. Norwich: Charles Muskett. 1847.
- "Suffolk Antiquities in the possession of Mr. Warren". Proceedings of the Suffolk Institute of Archæology, Statistics, and Natural History. 3. 1863.

== Bibliography ==
- Binyon, Laurence (1899). "Edward Thomas Daniell, Painter and Etcher". The Dome. IV (12). OCLC 665160418.
- Clifford, Derek Plint (1965). Watercolours of the Norwich School. Cory, Adams & Mackay. OCLC 30267610.
- Coates, Richard; Hanks, Richard; McClure, Peter (2016). The Oxford Dictionary of Family Names in Britain and Ireland. Vol. 3. Joynt-Radclyffe. Oxford: Oxford University Press. ISBN 978-0-19-967776-4.
- Cundall, Herbert Minton; Holme, Geoffrey (1920). The Norwich School. The Studio. London: Geoffrey Holme Ltd. OCLC 472125860.
- Day, Harold (1968). East Anglian Painters. Norwich School. Vol. II (1st ed.). Eastbourne: Fine Art. OCLC 314628502.
- Dickes, William Frederick (1905). The Norwich school of painting: being a full account of the Norwich exhibitions, the lives of the painters, the lists of their respective exhibits and descriptions of the pictures. Norwich: Jarrold & Sons Ltd. OCLC 1049955517.
- Duggan, T. M. P. (2019). Antalya: Some Accounts, Notices, References and Reports of the City of Antalya, and its History Published in English during the 19th Century, Together with Some Earlier References to the City, its Name and its History Published in English from the 16th to the 19th c. (PDF) (in English and Turkish). Translated by Bozkurtoğlu Özcan, Ö. Antalya, Turkey: Akedeniz University. ISBN 978-605-4483-51-8.
- Hemingway, Andrew (1979). The Norwich School of Painters, 1803-33. Oxford: Phaidon. ISBN 978-0-7148-2001-9.
- Moore, Andrew W. (1985). The Norwich School of Artists. HMSO/Norwich Museums Service. ISBN 978-0-11-701587-6.
- Rajnai, Miklos; Stevens, Mary (1976). The Norwich Society of Artists, 1805-1833: a dictionary of contributors and their work. Norwich: Norfolk Museums Service for the Paul Mellon Centre for Studies in British Art. ISBN 978-0-903101-29-5.
- Searle, Geoffrey R. (2015). Etchings of the Norwich School. Norwich: Lasse Press. ISBN 978-0-9568758-9-1.
- Smail, Richard (2004). "Daniell, Edward Thomas". Oxford Dictionary of National Biography (online ed.). Oxford University Press. doi:10.1093/ref:odnb/7123. (Subscription, Wikipedia Library access or UK public library membership required.)
- Story, Alfred Thomas (1892). "Chapter XVII". The Life of John Linnell. Vol. 1. London: Richard Bentley and Son. OCLC 679653922.
- Walpole, Josephine (1997). Art and Artists of the Norwich School. Woodbridge: Antique Collectors' Club. ISBN 978-1-85149-261-9.
