= Daniel Coppin =

English painter of landscapes and collector of art

- Born: 1771
- Died: 1822 (aged 50–51)
- Known for: Landscape painting
- Movement: Norwich School of painters

Daniel Coppin (1771–1822) was an accomplished amateur English painter of landscapes and a collector of art. He was one of the founding members of the Norwich School of painters, and one of three generations of artists from the same family, which included his daughter Emily Stannard.

== Life and family ==
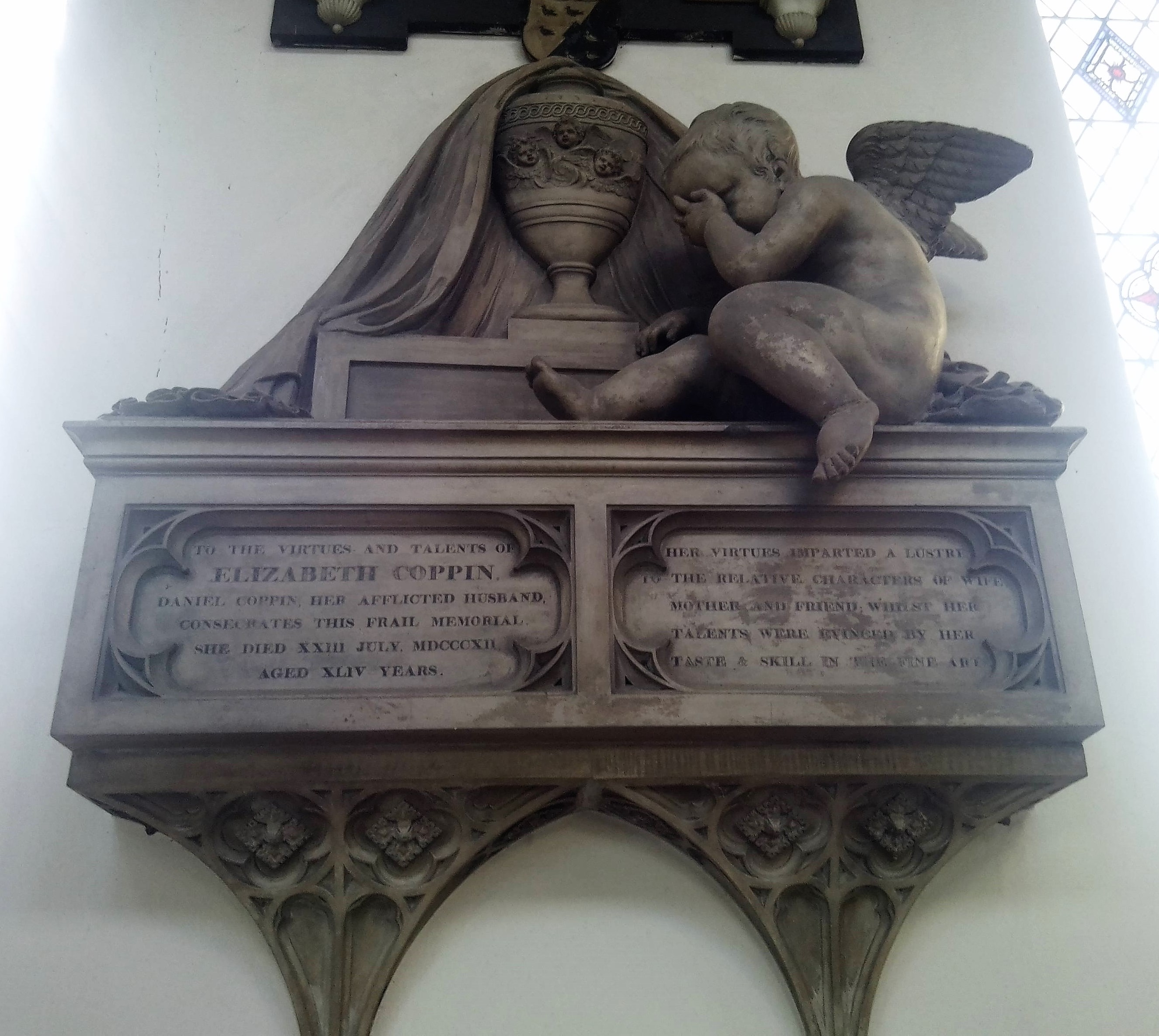
Memorial to Elizabeth Coppin

Little of Daniel Coppin's life has been documented and almost nothing is known of his childhood. He was born in 1771 and was the husband of Elizabeth Coppin (born Elizabeth Clyatt), whom he married at St. Giles' Church, Norwich on 2 November 1796. Coppin erected a memorial to his wife in St. Stephen's Church, Norwich, that contains biographical details of her life. (Note: Daniel Coppin's memorial to his wife can be seen in St Stephen's Church, Norwich.) Elizabeth Coppin was an accomplished artist who received accolades from the Norwich Society of Artists for her work.

He was the father of the painter Emily Coppin (Mrs Joseph Stannard), who was trained as a still life artist by both her parents. He was the grandfather of Emily Stannard, who was a minor Norwich artist.

== Career ==
In 1786 Coppin moved to Rampant Horse Street in Norwich to be near to the family's ornamental painting business. Coppin was one of several artists who were responsible for the creation of the transparencies for the Norwich celebrations of the British victory in Battle of the Nile in 1798 and declaration of peace in 1801.

In 1803 his friend John Crome and Robert Ladbrooke formed the Norwich Society of Artists, a group that also included Coppin as well as Robert Dixon, Charles Hodgson, James Stark and George Vincent. Their first exhibition, in 1805, marked the start of the Norwich School of painters, the first art movement created outside London. The following year he accompanied Crome and the dealer William Barnes Freeman on a visit to Paris to view the treasures of the Louvre, possible now that the Napoleonic Wars in Europe were at an end. During the visit Crome made sketches and bought works produced by French artists, which the group managed to smuggle back to England. The first exhibition of the Norwich Society, in 1805, marked the start of the Norwich School of Painters. In the exhibition, 223 works were shown by eighteen different exhibitors, including Coppin. Its success inspired the society to stage an exhibition every year, an event which continued until 1833. Coppin contributed regularly to the exhibitions and became President of the Society in 1816.

He was a keen collector of works of art: a catalogue of his collection of works was published in 1818 by John Stacey amounted to 266 individual pieces by the artist William Hogarth alone.

In 1820 he travelled to the Netherlands with his seventeen-year-old daughter Emily to view the depictions of still life produced by Dutch painters: the visit profoundly influenced her own artistic style.

== Death and legacy ==
Coppin died in 1822, aged 51 and residing at St. Catherine's Plain, Norwich, and was buried on 23 October 1822 in the churchyard of St. Stephen's, in the city. His death was announced in Charles Mackie's Norfolk Annals, where he was described as being "principally known for his highly creditable studies from Opie". The running of Coppin's business in Norwich passed to John Middleton, and upon Middleton's death passed to his son, the Norwich artist John Middleton.

Coppin was mentioned by the art writer H.M. Cundall as being "chiefly a copyist".

== Bibliography ==
- Cundall, Herbert Minton (1920). Holme, Geoffrey (ed.). The Norwich School. London: Geoffrey Holme Ltd. OCLC 651802612.
- Fawcett, Trevor (1976). "Eighteenth Century Art in Norwich". The Volume of the Walpole Society. 46: 85. JSTOR 41829357.
- Gray, Sara (2009). The Dictionary of British Women Artist s. Cambridge: Lutterworth Press. p. 249. ISBN 978-0-7188-30847.
- Hemingway, Andrew (1979). The Norwich School of Painters 1803–1833. Oxford: Phaidon. ISBN 978-0-7148-2001-9.
- Jeffares, Neil (2006). "Coppin, Mrs Daniel, née Elizabeth Clyatt". Dictionary of Pastellists before 1800 (online ed.). London: Unicorn Press. ISBN 978-09062-9-086-6.
- Walpole, Josephine (1997). Art and Artists of the Norwich School. Woodbridge, UK: Antique Collectors' Club. ISBN 978-1-85149-261-9.
