= Charles Hodgson (artist) =

British painter

- Born: c. 1770
- Died: 1856
- Known for: Landscape painting
- Movement: Norwich School of painters

Charles Hodgson (c. 1770 – 1856) was an amateur English landscape painter who was one of the founding members of the Norwich School of painters. His son was David Hodgson, a notable artist in his own right.

== Life ==
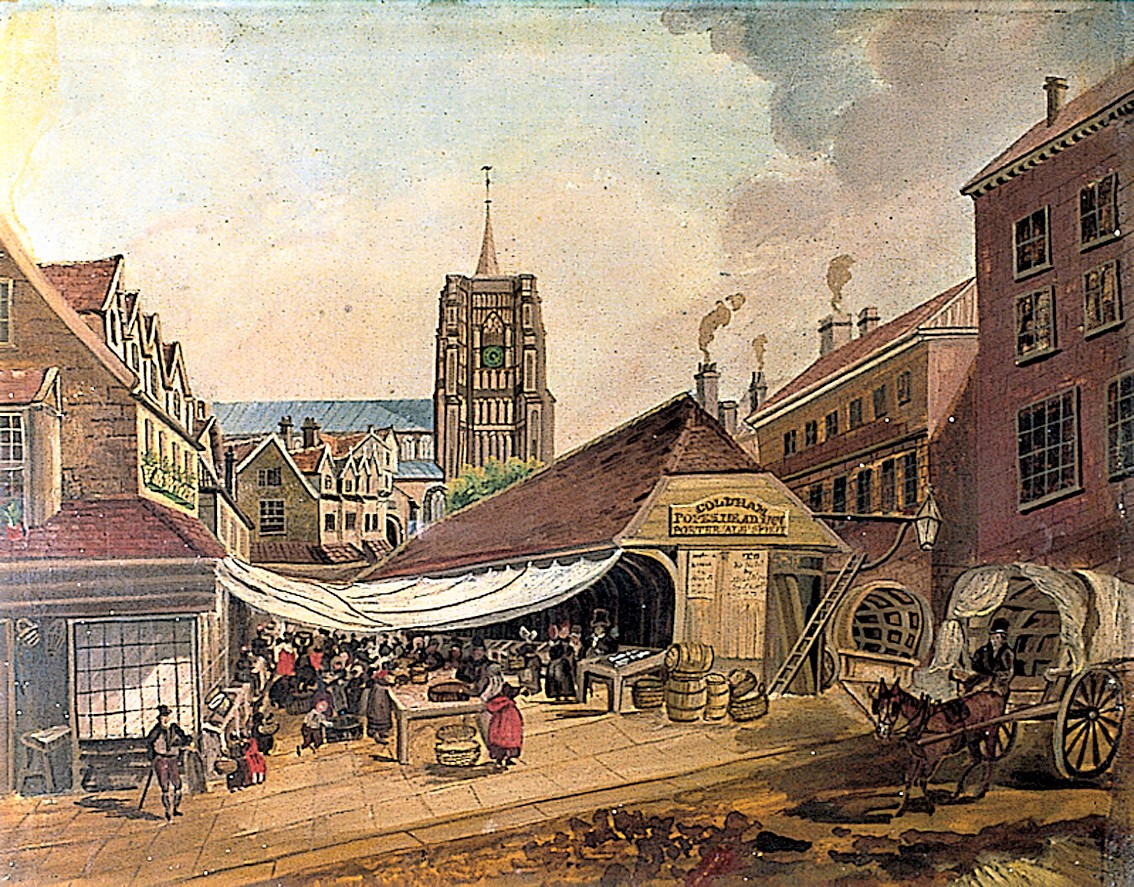
The Old Fishmarket, Norwich, oil, undated; The Museum of Norwich at the Bridewell

Charles Hodgson was born in around 1770 in Norwich. His father died when he was fourteen and the orphaned boy was adopted by a Mr Browne of North Walsham, who gave his foster son a good education and nurtured his interest in drawing and painting. Hodgson became a schoolmaster and taught English at the grammar school in North Walsham for a few years. On 15 May 1796 he married Nancy Chiswell in North Walsham. Their son David, who had several siblings, was born on 13 June 1798 and christened on 19 June in Yarmouth., based upon data collected by the Genealogical Society of Utah, Salt Lake City. As a boy David was encouraged to become an artist by his father and he exhibited his work at the Norwich Society of Artist's 1813 exhibition, and in later life became a noted artist and producer of literary works.

In around 1798 Hodgson moved to Norwich and worked as an assistant master at the grammar school. In 1803 John Crome and Robert Ladbrooke formed the Norwich Society of Artists, a group that also included Charles Hodgson, Robert Dixon, Daniel Coppin, James Stark and George Vincent. Their first exhibition, in 1805, marked the start of the Norwich School of painters, the first art movement created outside London.

His works, which are mainly of the interiors of buildings in and around Norwich, shown that he was a talented artist. His output was necessarily limited by the need to earn a steady income as a teacher. He exhibited in Norwich until 1825, after which he was appointed as Architectural Draughtsman to the Duke of Sussex. Little of what Hodgson produced during his amateur artistic career appears to have survived.

Hodgson later moved from Norwich to London, and then to Liverpool and Lancashire, where he died in 1856.

== Bibliography ==
- Chambers, John (1829). A general history of the county of Norfolk, intended to convey all the information of a Norfolk tour [by J. Chambers].
- Walpole, Josephine (1997). Art and Artists of the Norwich School. Woodbridge: Antique Collectors' Club. ISBN 1-85149-261-5.
