= Robert Dixon (artist) =

English painter

- Born: Robert Dixon; 28 September 1780
- Died: 1815 (aged 34–35)
- Known for: Landscape painting
- Movement: Norwich School of painters

Robert Dixon (1780–1815) was an English artist, known for his work in watercolour painting. He was a member of the Norwich School of painters.

== Life ==
The parish records for St Mary Coslany Church, Norwich, show that Robert Dixon was born on 28 September 1780 and was baptised the following week on 8 October. He was trained at the Royal Academy Schools and in his early twenties became a scenery painter for the Theatre Royal in Norwich. He is known to have turned down an offer to work in London with the stage designer William Capon.

In 1803 John Crome and Robert Ladbrooke formed the Norwich Society of Artists, a group that also included Dixon, Charles Hodgson, Daniel Coppin, James Stark and George Vincent. Their first exhibition, in 1805, marked the start of the Norwich School of painters, the first art movement created outside London. He contributed with the Norwich Society of Artists from 1805, but poor health forced to resign his membership from the Society in 1812. He died in 1815, aged 35.

== Bibliography ==
- Walpole, Josephine (1997). Art and Artists of the Norwich School. Woodbridge: Antique Collectors' Club Holme. ISBN 1-85149-261-5.
