= Robert Ladbrooke =

English painter (1768–1842)

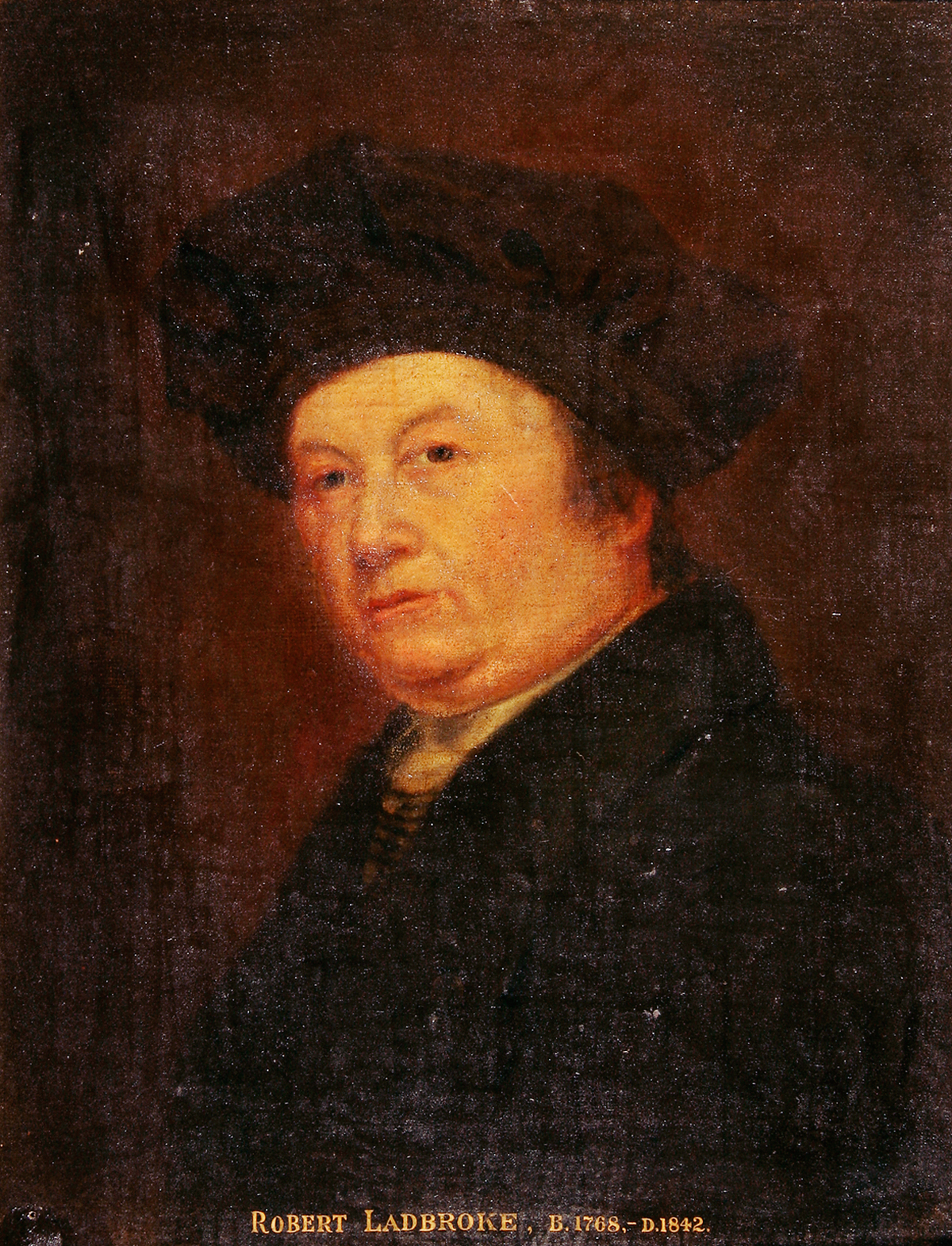
- 1810 portrait of Ladbrooke
- Born: 1768; Norwich, England
- Died: 11 October 1842 (aged 73–74); Norwich, England
- Occupation: Painter
- Known for: Norwich School of painters

Robert Ladbrooke (1768 – 11 October 1842) was an English landscape painter who, along with John Crome, founded the Norwich School of painters. His sons Henry Ladbrooke and John Berney Ladbrooke were also associated with the Norwich School.

== Early life ==
Ladbrooke was born in Norwich in 1768. He was apprenticed when young to an artist and printer named White, and for some years worked as a journeyman printer. While employed there he made the acquaintance of the artist John Crome, who was the same age as him, then working for a house and sign-painter. Having similar tastes, the two became friends. They lived together and devoted all their spare time to sketching and copying. They married two sisters, and for two years they worked in partnership.

== Artistic career ==
Ladbrooke painted portraits and Crome depicted landscapes, which they both sold for very small sums. To earn more money, Ladbrooke turned from portraiture to landscape painting, in which he was more successful.

In 1803 Ladbrooke and Crome formed the Norwich Society of Artists, a group that also included Robert Dixon, Charles Hodgson, Daniel Coppin, James Stark and George Vincent. Their first exhibition, in 1805, marked the start of the Norwich School of painters, the first art movement created outside London. Ladbrooke contributed fourteen works to its first exhibition in 1805. In 1808, when Crome became president, Ladbrooke was elected as vice-president. In 1816, Ladbrooke, along with Joseph Stannard, John Thirtle and five other members of the Norfolk Society, having ineffectually urged a modification of some of the rules, seceded from the society, but this venture ultimately failed and was abandoned after three years. Between 1804 and 1815 Ladbrooke was an occasional exhibitor at the Royal Academy, and until 1822 he exhibited works at the British Institution. He was a successful teacher, and was able to enjoy a long and comfortable retirement.

Ladbrooke painted chiefly of views of Norfolk scenery; but his reputation has never been more than local to this part of England. He published aquatints of two of his pictures, A View of the Fellmongers on the River near Bishop's Bridge and A View of Norwich Castle. His Views of the Churches of Norfolk, a series of over 650 lithographic plates, were published in five volumes in 1843.

Ladbrooke died at his house on Scoles' Green, Norwich, on 11 October 1842.

== Family ==
Ladbrooke had four sons, all of whom were artists to varying degrees, with Henry and John Berney Ladbrooke achieving the most success.

His second son Henry was born at Norwich on 20 April 1800. He wished to enter the Church, but respected his father's wish for him to become a landscape painter. He acquired a good reputation, especially for his moonlight scenes, and he exhibited occasionally at the British Institution and the Suffolk Street Gallery. He died on 18 November 1870.

John Berney Ladbrooke, Robert Ladbrooke's third son, was born in 1803. He became a pupil of John Crome, who was his uncle by marriage, and whose manner he followed. John Berney Ladbrooke excelled in the representation of woodland scenery. He exhibited at the Royal Academy in 1821 and 1822, and frequently at the British Institution and the Suffolk Street Gallery up to 1873. He died at Mousehold, Norwich, on 11 July 1879.

== Gallery ==
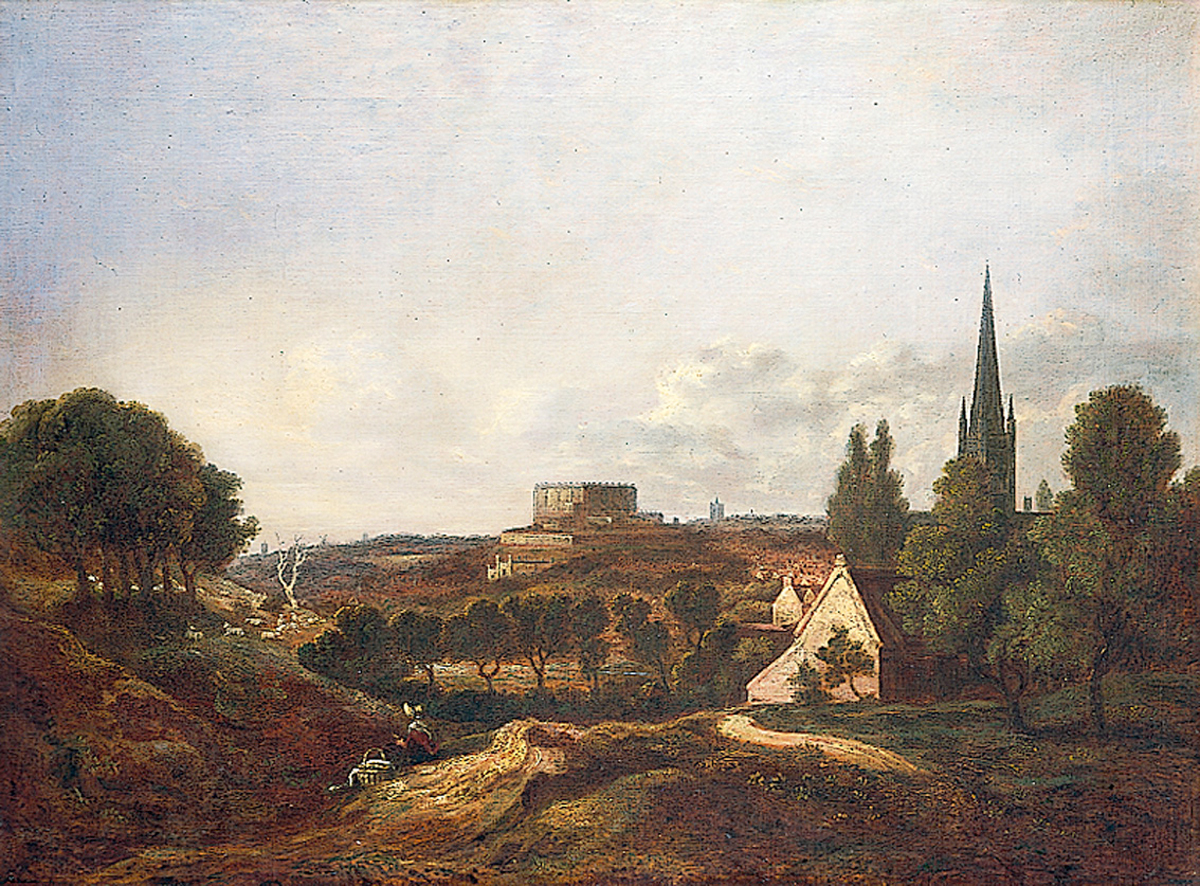

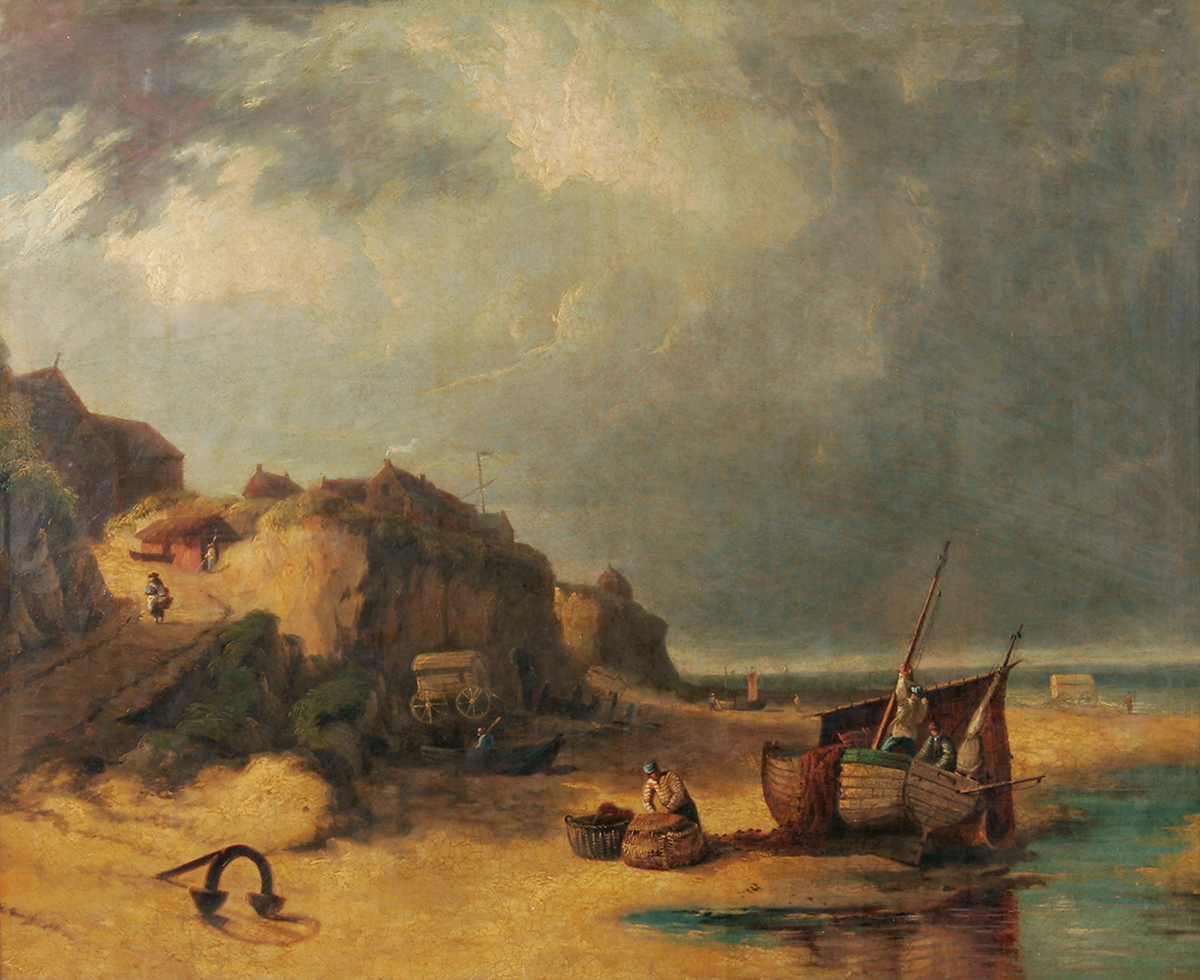

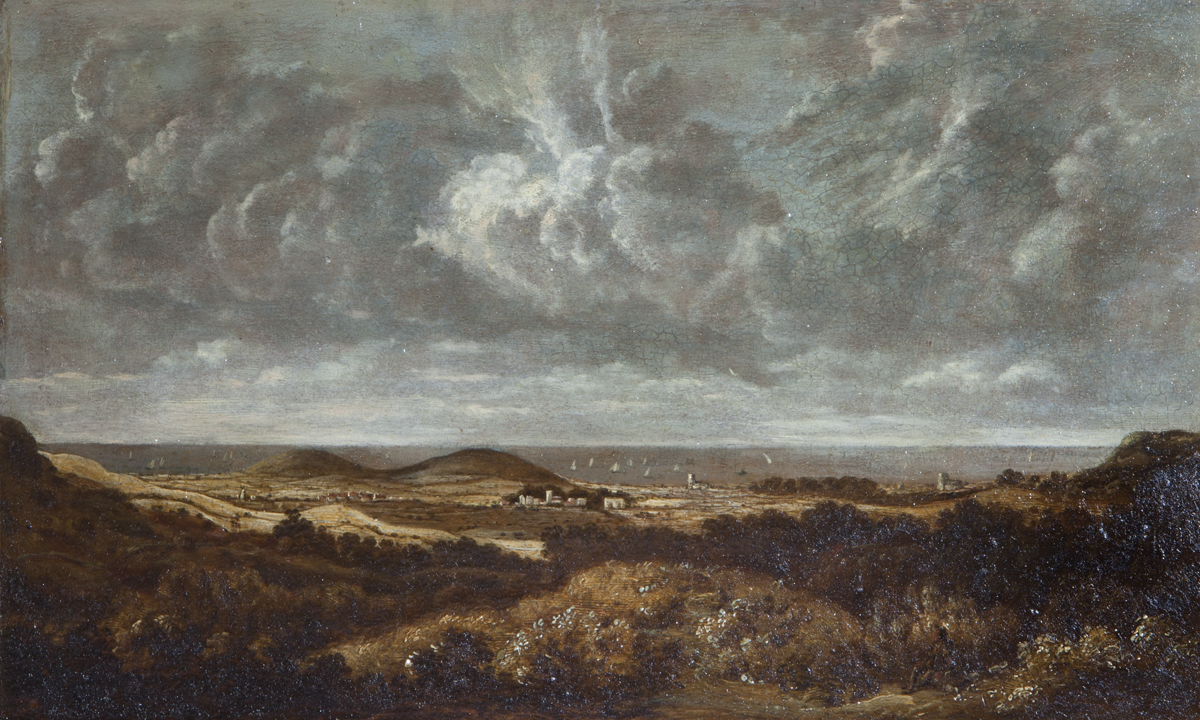

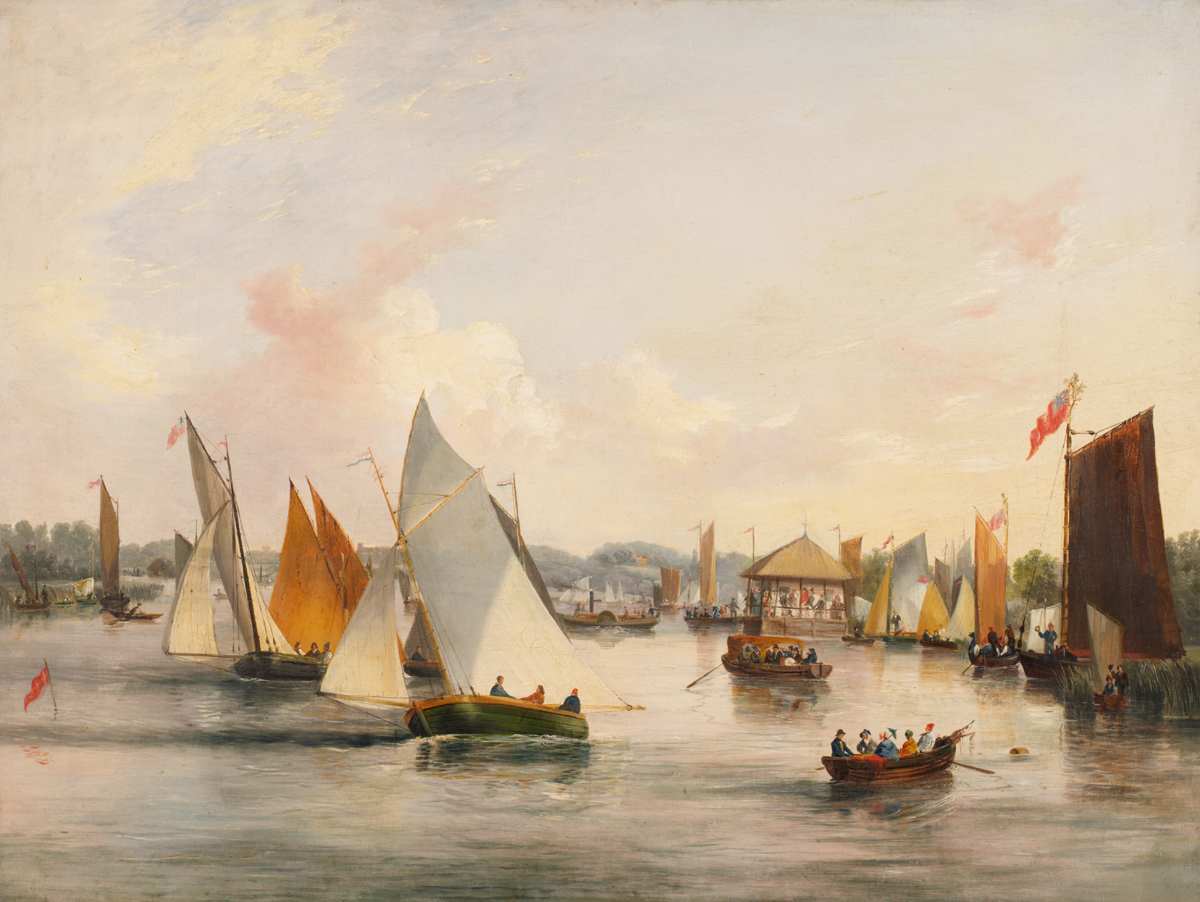

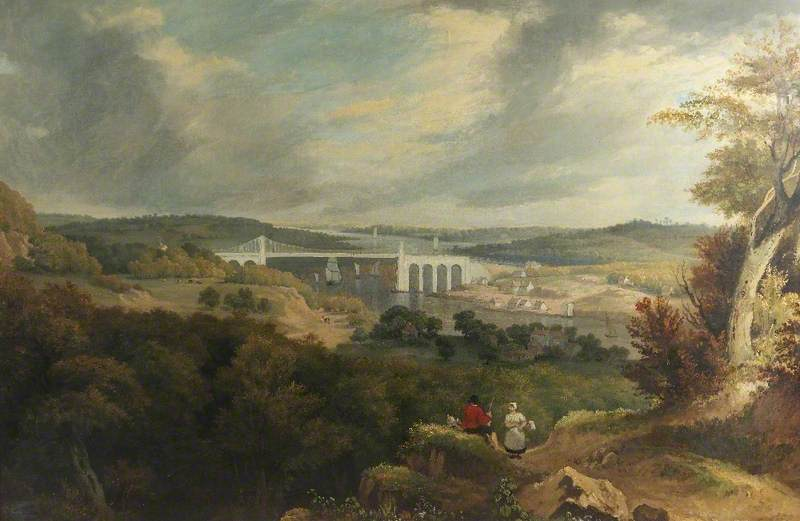
