= Andrew Hemingway =

Andrew Frank Hemingway is professor emeritus of art history, University College London. He is a specialist in British landscape painting of the nineteenth century, which he interprets through a Marxist lens, and the historiography of Marxist art history.

== Early life and education ==
Andrew Hemingway received his advanced education at the universities of Hull and East Anglia. He received his PhD from University College London for a thesis which he began in 1977 and which was accepted in 1989 titled Discourses of art and social interests: The representation of landscape in Britain c.1800-1830 which was supervised by William Vaughan.

== Career ==
Hemingway's early academic career was at Ealing College of Higher Education. He taught at University College London from 1987 to 2010, becoming a professor there in 2003. He is now an emeritus professor at the college. His work relates to nineteenth century landscape painting, which he interprets through a Marxist lens, and the historiography of Marxism as it relates to art history about which he edited a collection of essays that was published by Pluto Press in 2006.

Hemingway's first published book (1979) was on the Norwich School of painters in the early decades of the nineteenth century which was followed by his comprehensive treatment of early nineteenth century British landscape painting Landscape imagery and urban culture in early nineteenth-century Britain (based on his PhD thesis) that was published by Cambridge University Press in 1992. Since then, Hemingway has written or edited three books on Marxism and art. His recent work has concentrated on American art.

== Selected publications ==
- The Norwich School of Painters 1803-1833. Phaidon, Oxford, 1979. ISBN 9780714820019
- Landscape imagery and urban culture in early nineteenth-century Britain. Cambridge University Press, Cambridge, 1992. ISBN 0521391180
- Artists on the left: American artists and the communist movement, 1926–1956. Yale University Press, New Haven, 2002.
- Marxism and the history of art: From William Morris to the New Left. Pluto Press, London, 2006. (Editor) ISBN 9780745323299
- As radical as reality itself: Essays on Marxism and art for the 21st century. 2007. (Joint editor)
- The mysticism of money: Precisionist painting and machine age America. Periscope, Pittsburgh, 2009. ISBN 9781934772805
- Transatlantic romanticism: British and American art and literature, 1790–1860. 2015. (Edited with Alan Wallach)
