= George Vincent (painter) =

English painter (by 1796 – c. 1832)

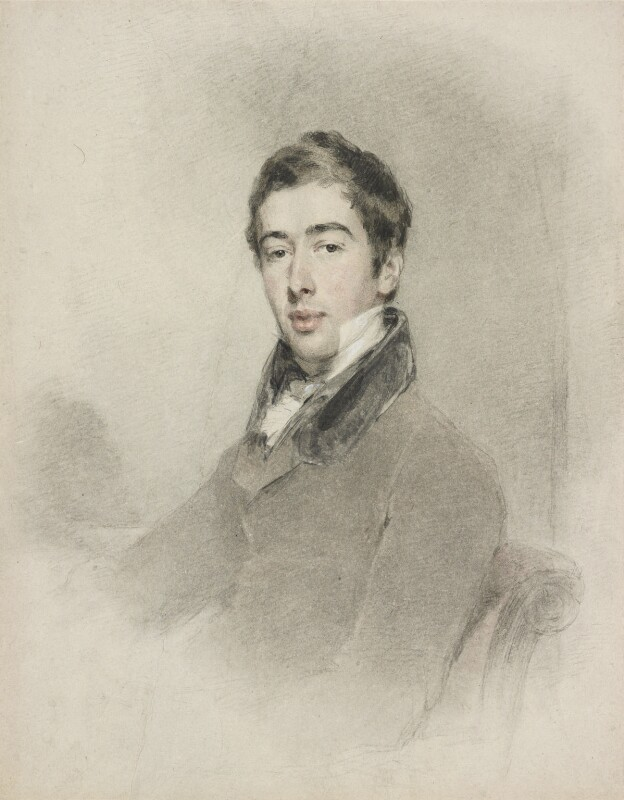
- John Jackson's portrait of Vincent (c.1820), National Portrait Gallery, London
- Born: Norwich, England
- Baptised: 27 June 1796
- Died: c. 1832 (aged 35–36) possibly Bath, Somerset, England
- Education: Norwich Grammar School; a pupil of John Crome
- Known for: Landscape painting
- Notable work: Oil paintings, including Greenwich Hospital from the River (1827)
- Movement: Norwich School of painters
- Relatives: William Jackson Hooker (cousin)
- Elected: Member of the Norwich Society of Artists (1815–1831)

George Vincent (baptised 27 June 1796 – c.1832) was an English landscape painter who produced watercolours, etchings and oil paintings. He is considered by art historians to be one of the most talented of the Norwich School of painters, a group of artists inspired by the Norfolk countryside. Vincent's work was founded on the Dutch school of landscape painting as well as the style of John Crome, also of the Norwich School. The school's reputation outside East Anglia in the 1820s was based largely upon the works of Vincent and his friend James Stark.

The son of a weaver, Vincent was educated at Norwich Grammar School and afterwards apprenticed to Crome. He exhibited at the Royal Academy, British Institution, and elsewhere. From 1811 until 1831 he showed at the Norwich Society of Artists, exhibiting more than 100 pictures of Norfolk landscapes and marine works. By 1818 he had relocated to London, where in 1821 he married the supposedly wealthy daughter of a surgeon. There he obtained the patronage of wealthy clients, yet struggled financially. The purchase of an expensive house, combined with a tendency towards drink, exacerbated his financial problems and led to his incarceration in the Fleet Prison for debt in 1824. Before his release in 1827 he had resumed his connection with the Norwich Society of Artists, albeit with a much lower output of work.

After 1831, Vincent disappeared. He was never found, despite attempts by his family to locate him, and his whereabouts after this date remain uncertain. His death may have occurred before April 1832, perhaps in Bath. His picture Greenwich Hospital from the River, which was shown in London three decades after his death, caused renewed interest in his paintings and helped to establish his reputation as a leading member of the Norwich School. The art historian Herbert Minton Cundall wrote in the 1920s that had Vincent "not given way to intemperate habits he would probably have ranked amongst the foremost of British landscape painters".

== Background ==
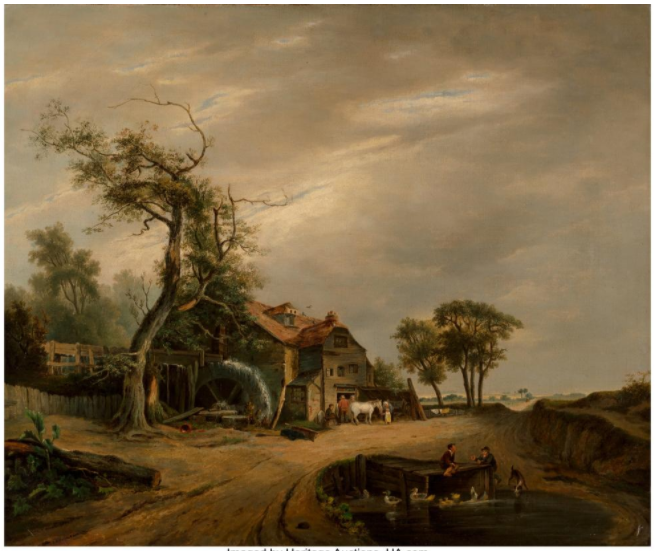
Vincent's An Old Farmstead near Norwich (undated) was inspired, as were many works by the Norwich School of painters, by the Norfolk countryside

The Norwich School of painters was a regional school of landscape painters connected personally or professionally. Though mainly inspired by the Norfolk countryside, many also depicted other landscapes and coastal and urban scenes. The school's most important members were John Crome and John Sell Cotman—the leading spirits and finest artists of the movement (Note: James Reeve, an early authority on the Norwich School, said of Crome and Cotman, "Although Crome had not the early advantages in education, etc., that Cotman had, great credit is due to him for the way he educated and improved himself, and in mature life the society in which he moved was in some cases quite equal to that of Cotman. Their feeling for art was altogether different, but they must have had much in common and were good friends.")—as well as Vincent, James Stark, Joseph Stannard, Robert Ladbrooke and Edward Thomas Daniell, the best etcher of the school.

It was a unique phenomenon in the history of 19th-century British art; Norwich produced more successful artists than any other similar city in England, and its theatrical, artistic, philosophical and musical cultures were cross-fertilised in a way that was unique outside the capital. Originally regarded as modern and progressive, the movement was by the end of the 19th century seen as belonging to a bygone age, due to what the art historian Andrew Hemingway describes as the "mythology of rural Englishness" that prevailed.

The Norwich Society of Artists was founded by Crome and Ladbrooke in 1803. It arose from a sense of collective identity (but not a common style) that emerged among the many artists supported by Norwich patrons. They influenced each other by forming evening meetings, sketching together, and exhibiting their works; Crome and Ladbrooke took on apprentices, whilst others taught amateurs, all of whom tended to imitate the style of their teachers. It was created "for the purpose of an Enquiry into the Rise, Progress and present state of Painting, Archaeology and Sculpture with a view to point out the Best Methods of Study to Attain to Greater Perfection in these Arts". It held regular exhibitions and had an organised structure, showing works annually until 1825 and again from 1828 until it was dissolved in 1833. Almost every professional artist in Norwich exhibited with the Society, but not all of the members of the Norwich School belonged to it.

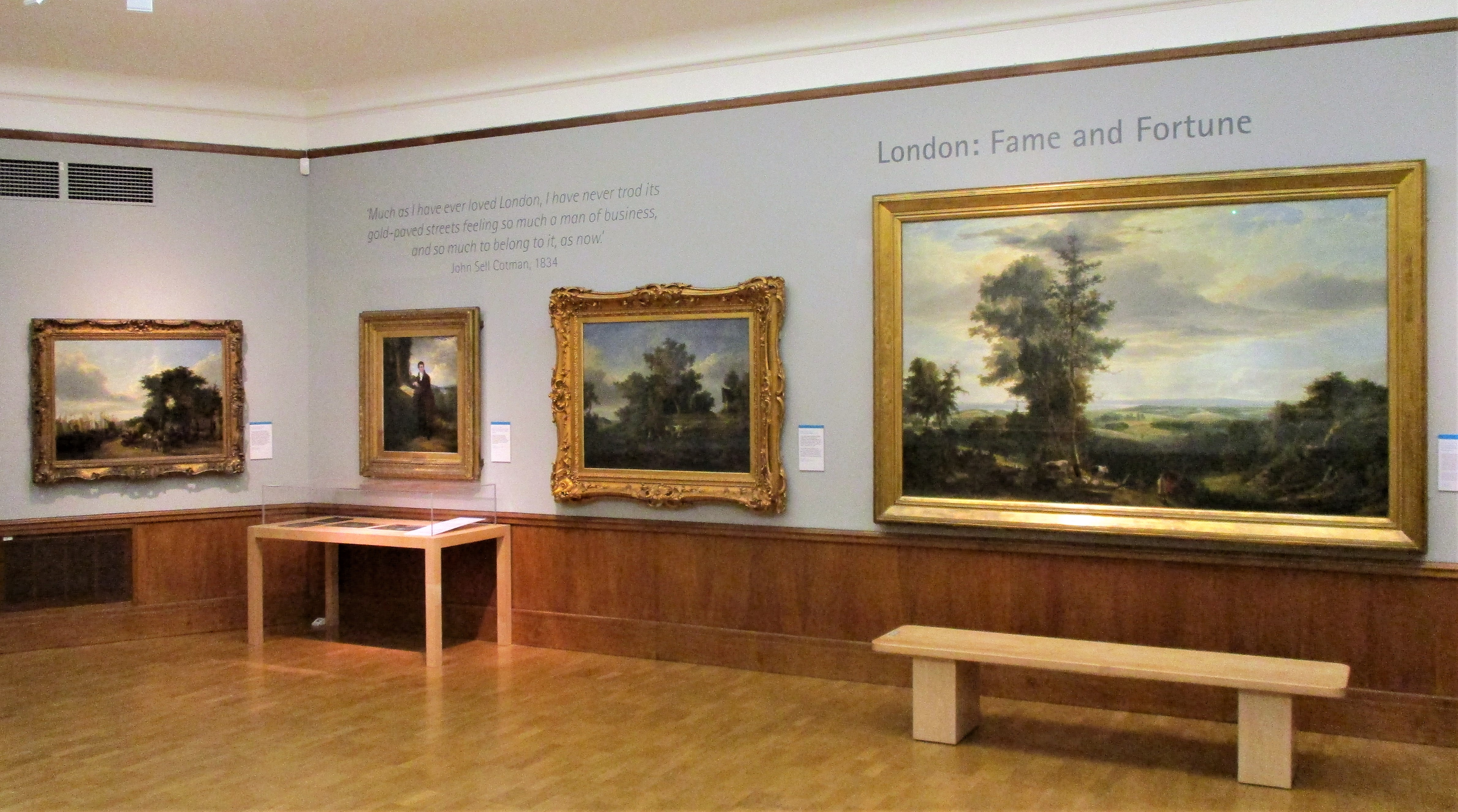
Works by the Norwich School of painters at the Norwich Castle Museum in 2019

At the end of the 17th century, other schools of painting had begun to form, associated with artists such as Francis Towne at Exeter and John Malchair at Oxford. Other centres of population outside London were creating art societies, whose painters and drawing masters influenced their pupils. Unlike those of the Norwich School, these artists did not benefit from wealthy merchants and landed gentry demonstrating their patriotism by acquiring picturesque paintings of the English countryside. The Norwich Society of Artists, the first group of its kind to be created since the formation of the Royal Academy in 1768, was remarkable in acting in its members' interests for 30 years—a longer period than for any other similar group.

After the dissolution of the Norwich Society of Artists in 1833, and Cotman's death in 1842, no professional artists of a similar calibre remained in Norwich. Interest in the school fell off during the 1830s, until their reputation re-emerged after the Royal Academy's 1878 Winter Exhibition.

== Life ==
=== Family and education ===
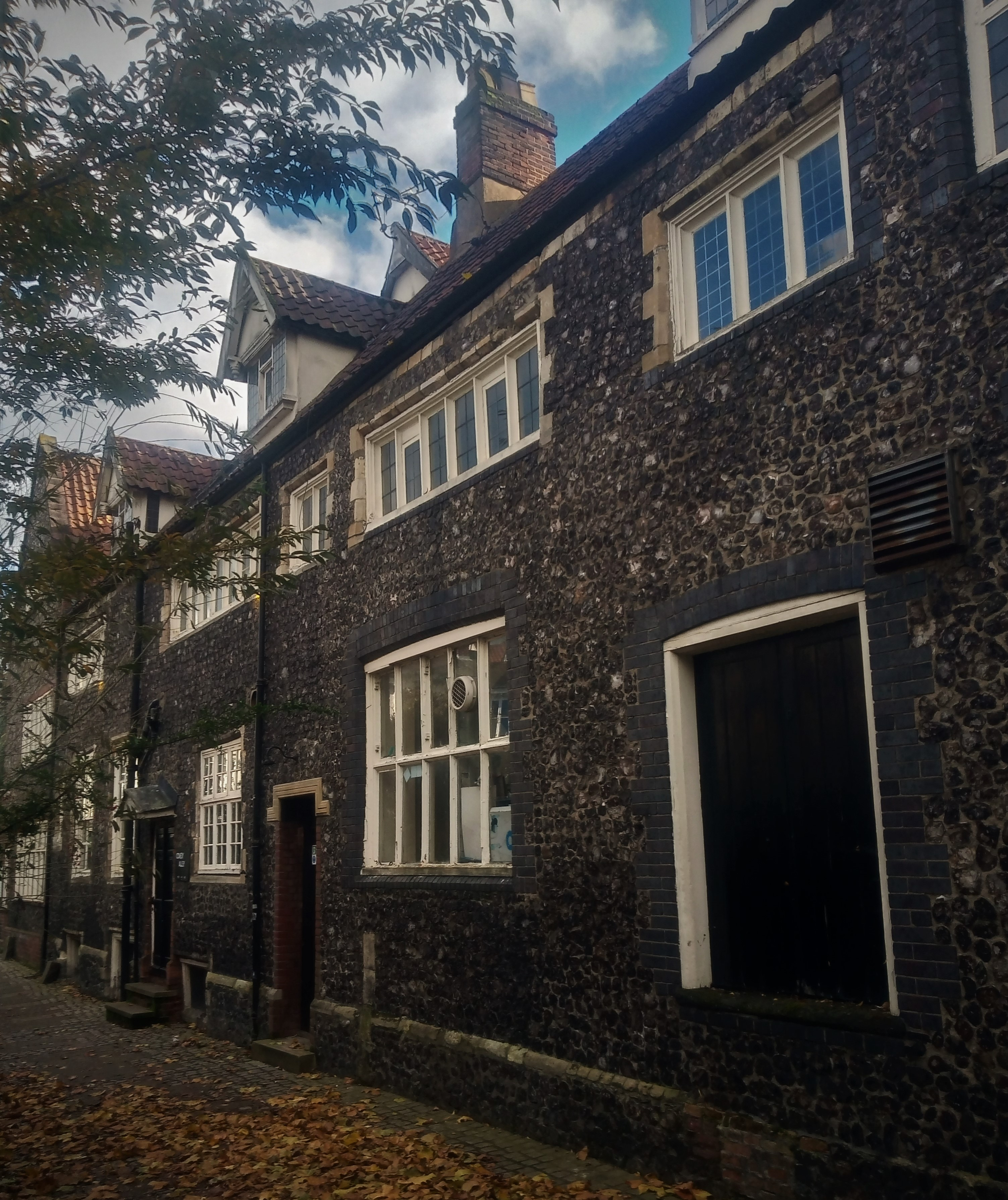
St Clements Church Alley, Norwich

George Vincent, the eldest surviving son of James Vincent and his first wife Mary Freeman, was baptised on 27 June 1796, at St John the Baptist's Church, Timberhill. Two years earlier, his older brother—also named George—had died in infancy; a brother named James, who survived to adulthood, is recorded. His mother died around 1800. His father was a worsted weaver who manufactured shawls. On his mother's side, George was a cousin of William Jackson Hooker, who became the Director of the Royal Botanic Gardens at Kew in 1841. Vincent lived with his family in a house on St. Clement's Church Alley, close to the River Wensum, remaining there until he moved away from Norwich in around 1818.

Vincent was educated at Norwich Grammar School, where he became good friends with John Berney Crome and his brother Frederick, and formed a life-long friendship with James Stark, whose father Michael Stark, a dye manufacturer, would have known Vincent's father through his business connections. He enjoyed drawing with charcoal at an early age.

John Crome, who was the best-known drawing-master in Norwich, had with the help of his friends been secured a post at the Grammar School as a drawing master, and would have taught Vincent and his classmates; the post, although likely to have been part-time, was nevertheless his most important teaching activity. Known as "Old Crome" at the school, he was a great favourite with the boys, who greatly enjoyed tricking their teacher into completing their drawings, or more often than not producing a new work of his own. He would paint with extraordinary rapidity, quite forgetting how time was passing, and "with the boys looking on at him admiring his artistic skill".

=== Early adulthood (1812–1821) ===
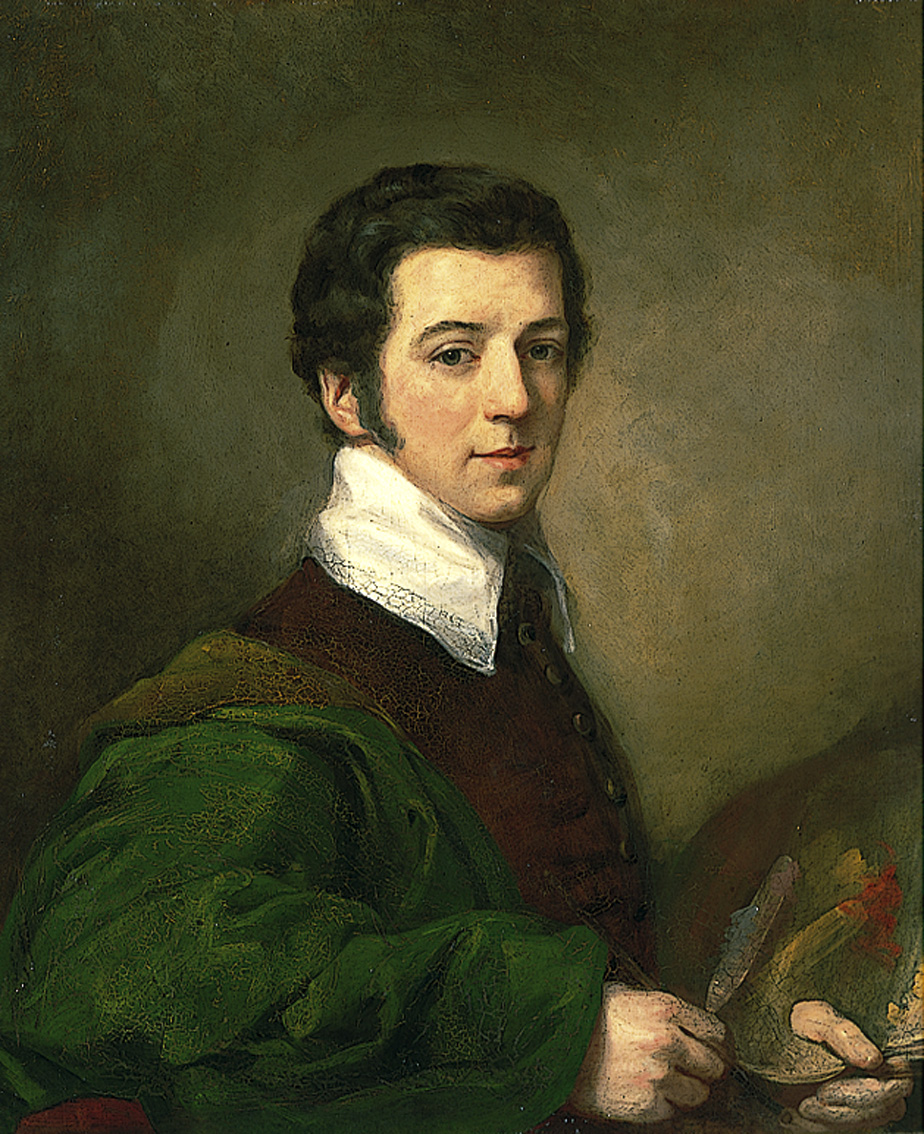
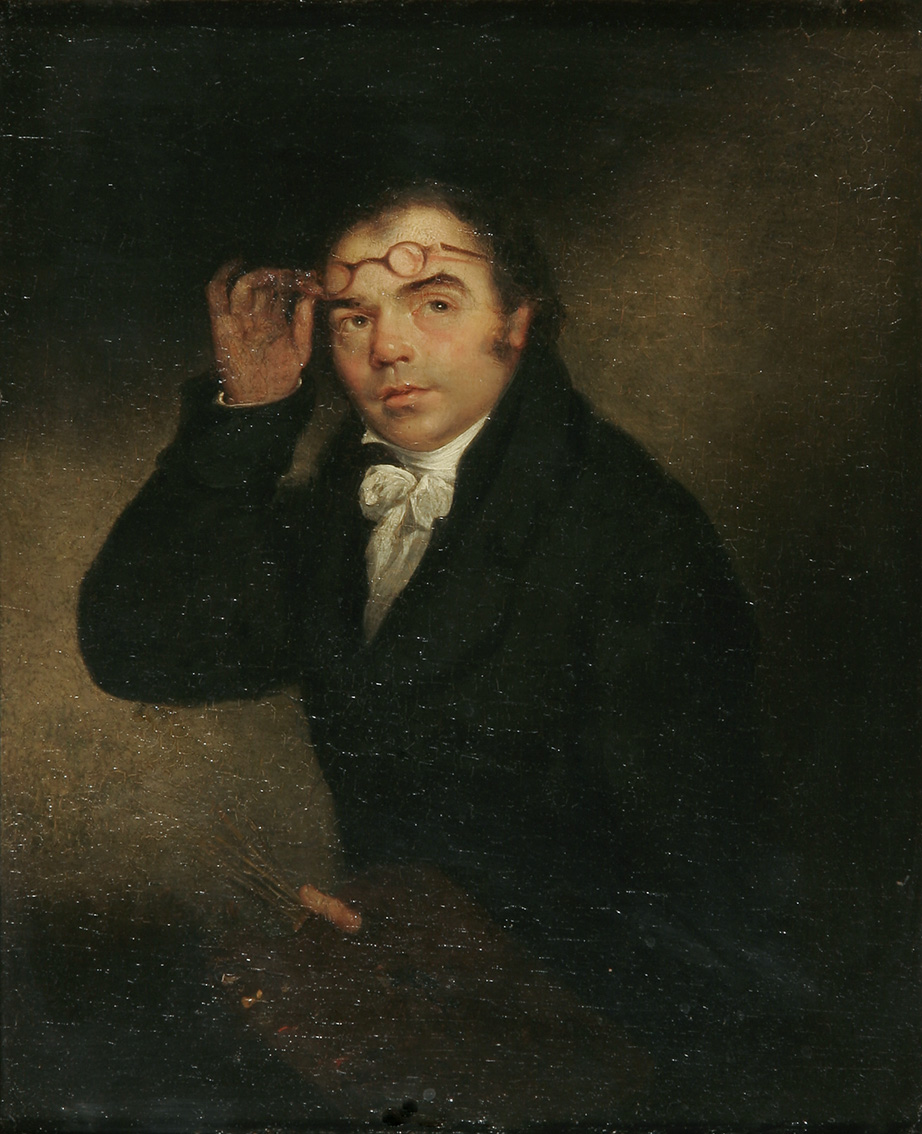
(left) James Stark, Vincent's friend from boyhood; (right) John Crome, to whom both were apprenticed

On leaving school, George Vincent, John Berney Crome and James Stark were apprenticed to John Crome, perhaps as early as 1812. Vincent's first exhibited works, two of which were described as "after Crome", were shown at Sir Benjamin Wrench's Court in 1811 and 1812. The three friends, of whom Vincent was the most talented, travelled together on sketching and painting trips, influencing each other's artistic styles in the process. In January 1816 Vincent travelled to France and the Netherlands with John Berney Crome and Benjamin Steel, a surgeon who was to marry John Berney's sister Hannah six years later. In a letter written by John Crome, Vincent was reported to be seasick during the crossing to France. Rouen, now in the Norfolk Museums Collections, is the only painting produced from this visit. It was followed by a tour of Essex, during which time he painted works depicting the villages of Ingatestone and Little Baddow, and in 1816 he and Stark exhibited views of Windsor after touring the area. In around 1818 he left his family home on St. Clement's Church Alley and moved to London, residing first at 7 Wells Street, and then at 86 Newman Street, next door to Stark. Nearly every house on Newman Street was occupied by working artists; according to the Survey of London: South-East Marylebone, "by the time a Newman Street address had become a step on the road to fame, the really famous had moved out". Vincent lived there until 1821.

The most important place in London for studying Old Masters was at the British Institution; Vincent and Stark both studied there after they enrolled at the Institute's school in 1817. The artists they studied probably included Aelbert Cuyp, Jan Dirksz Both, Meindert Hobbema, Aert van der Neer and Nicolaes Pieterszoon Berchem. They would have been influenced by other collections in the capital, as well as pictures on display at auction houses, and works shown in exhibitions. Almost all the pictures at the Dulwich Picture Gallery, including those by Cuyp, Philips Wouwerman, Peter Paul Rubens and Anthony van Dyck, could be viewed after it opened to the public in 1817, and students such as Vincent and Stark were encouraged by the college to study and copy its collection. After two years Stark was forced to return home to Norwich due to ill health.

In 1819 Vincent toured Scotland, which resulted in paintings such as View of Edinburgh from Calton Hill and Fishing Boats on the Bank of the Forth—the quality of which, according to Day, shows how the artist was at the height of his powers during this period. The following year he exhibited at the Society of Painters in Oil and Watercolours his London from the Surrey Side of Waterloo Bridge, considered by the author William Frederick Dickes to be an important work. It was purchased by John Leicester, 1st Baron de Tabley and shown to the public in his London gallery before being relocated to his collection at Tabley House, Cheshire.

=== Marriage and subsequent decline ===
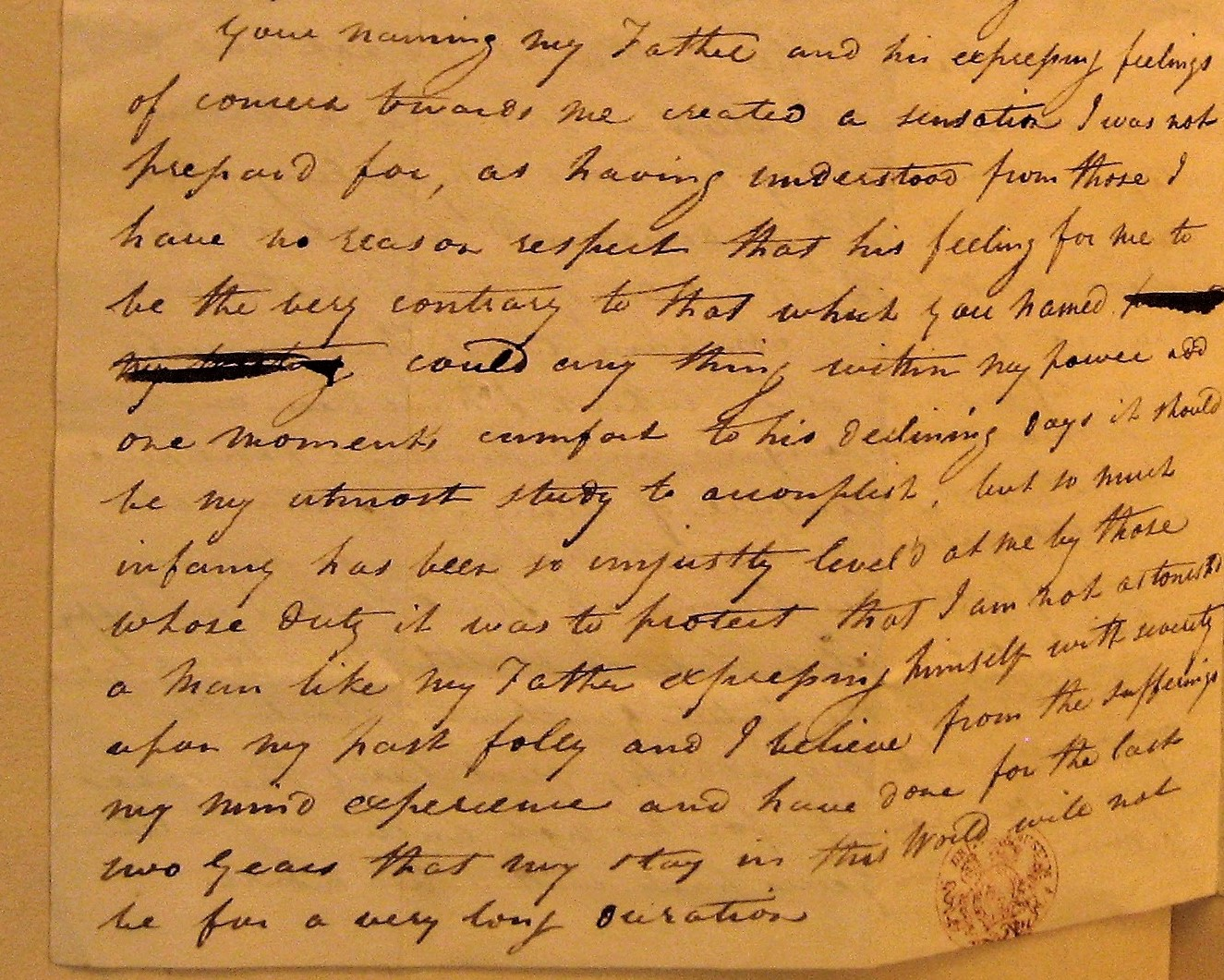
Part of George Vincent's letter to William Davey (27 July 1824), referring to his "past folly".

Vincent and Stark travelled from Norfolk to London to attend John Crome's funeral in 1821. At this time Vincent was ill, although the reason for his poor health is not given by any sources or mentioned in his published letters. (Note: See Dickes, The Norwich School of painting, pp. 409–505 for transcripts of Vincent's correspondence from London to his friend Davey.) The art historian Josephine Walpole considers that his misfortunes began once he was left without his old teacher to act as a steadying influence.

On 3 November 1821 he married 19-year-old Mary Elizabeth Cugnoni, the only daughter of the physician James Cugnoni, who was, according to Stark, extremely wealthy. The event was recorded in the Norfolk Chronicle a week later. No children are known to have been produced from the marriage. Vincent bought a house in Camden Town (Note: Vincent's residence was described as being "opposite Fitzroy Place, Camden Town" in Graves' The British Institution, 1806–1867. Fitzroy Place, which no longer exists, was a small street to the north of Fitzroy Square.) that was more than his own income could afford; it was sold when, for reasons that have never been explained, his wife's money failed to materialise. (Note: The house was referred to by some sources as being in Kentish Town.) By the summer of 1824 he and his wife were living at 26 Upper Thornhaugh Street, close to Bedford Square, a more affordable house closer to the centre of London. (Note: Upper Thornaugh Street, parallel to Tottenham Court Road and north of Bedford Square, was renamed Huntley Street in the 1830s. The street appeared on London maps of the period labelled with either name. All the streets where Vincent lived (except for his house in Camden Town) can be found using Christopher Greenwood's and George Cruchley's 1827 maps of London.)

Vincent's health deteriorated and his debts mounted, in part because of his drinking habits. In a letter dated 27 July 1824 to his friend William Davey, he referred to a "past folly", which seems to have been the cause of a permanent rift between Vincent and his Norwich friends, as well as with his father, already troubled by his intemperance. His letters to Davey reveal his financial problems and include a reference to the "infamy" he felt was levelled at him. (Note: Correspondence from Vincent to his friend William Davey are in the British Library.) No details have emerged about the nature of the 'folly' mentioned in the letter; Walpole suggests Vincent's intemperance contributed to the 'folly', and mentions "strange and unpleasant rumours" about Vincent that were circulating, whilst the art historian Campbell Dodgson presumed that his debts were the cause. In a letter written in October that year to Davey, Vincent wrote, "To me it has been—and likewise to my better half—a great source of pleasure to wander over the scenes of former days." To the author Harold Day, this implied that he was happily married at this time. By now Davey was having to help his friend sell works in Norwich at lower than expected prices.

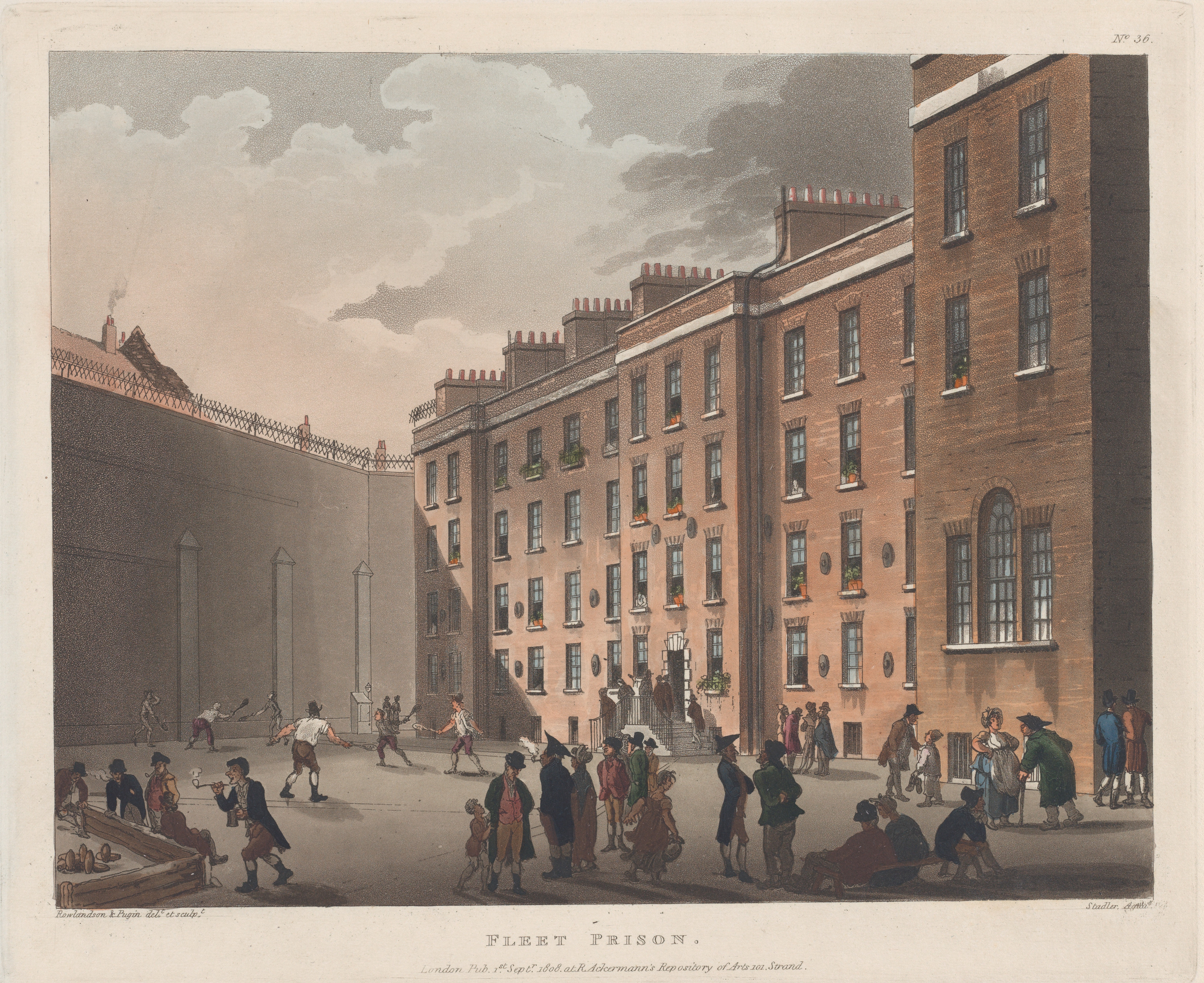
An 1808 illustration of Fleet Prison, where Vincent was incarcerated from 1824 to 1827

In 1824 Vincent started to prepare two pictures, of the Battle of the Nile and the Battle of Trafalgar, to compete for a prize offered by the directors of the British Gallery. Although living in London, he still saw himself as a Norfolk man, writing of the Royal Navy officer Nelson: "The Norfolk hero gained those battles, and shall it be said that Norfolk artists would not contend for the prize now offered?"

Neither painting was completed. His inability to pay off his debts led to his committal to the Fleet Prison in December 1824, and for the next three years he lived in the 3rd gallery (i.e. on the third floor), unable to complete any large works. A letter to Davey written after his arrival at the Fleet revealed his embarrassment, requesting that when he spoke to James Stark: "As it will be necessary to name it to J.S., beg of him not to notice my residence to a soul; and, above all, do not name it to my father, as it would make the poor old man very miserable." (Note: Part of the letter written from Vincent to his friend in Norwich reads, "I shall experience very great inconvenience from being shut up in this miserable place. I can paint small pictures here but not any of size, but this is not the only evil. Being excluded from the world I shall find it no small difficulty to dispose of my works when painted, and, should I reserve them for the Exhibition, in all probability the money may not be forthcoming until after the close. Having two small pictures finished, intended for the British Gallery, the one 36 x 25, A View in Glen Skerrah, near Inverary, and the second 17 x 14, Boats Making for Home at the approaching Storm. If there are any of your friends who would like to have them at a very low price I need not say how much it would benefit me upon the present occasion. For No. 1, I would be glad to take £15, for No. 2, £8, being half the price I should ask for them at the Gallery. As it will be necessary to name it to J. S. beg of him not to notice my residence to a soul; and, above all, do not name it to my father, as it would make the poor old man very miserable. Pray favour me with a line and direct as usual, as I should be sorry the people at the Post Office at Norwich should see any address to me here .... Hoping you and Mrs. Davey and the happy trio are quite well. I remain, Your Obedient Servant, No. 8 Third Gallery, The Fleet, George Vincent. 27 December 1824.") His father-in-law and friends helped him to exhibit his paintings, including five shown in Norwich (Entrance to Loch Katrine – moonlight; Highlanders Spearing Salmon and four others simply entitled Landscape). After a year in the Fleet, and accompanied by a prison keeper, he visited Stark at Norwich. When there he attempted to resume connections with his friends, and raise funds from the sale of his paintings or by some other means.

=== Disappearance (from 1831) ===
Vincent remained at the Fleet until his release on 13 February 1827. In 1828, he sent six pictures to the Norwich exhibition and in 1831 he showed one painting there, the last shown in public during his lifetime. After 1831, Vincent disappeared from public view, and was not heard from or seen by his friends again, despite attempts by his family to locate him. The botanist Joseph Dalton Hooker, writing in his father's 1902 biography, recalled that "George Vincent was well educated and brought up, but lost himself. My father, his cousin, vainly endeavoured to trace his end in London." In the catalogue of his pictures shown by the Society of British Artists in 1832, Vincent was described as deceased, but uncertainty surrounds both the date and cause of his death. He may have died before 14 April 1832, possibly at Bath in a workhouse, as a notice appeared in the Norwich Mercury on that day: "Died lately at Bath, in his 36th year, Mr George Vincent, artist, son of Mr. James Vincent, of this city." The writer Ralph Hale Mottram described Vincent's death as "completely mysterious" and suggested that his wish to avoid creditors was a possible reason for his disappearance.

According to the Morning Advertiser, the contents of his London house were sold in January 1833. The 1899 edition of the Dictionary of National Biography claimed that Vincent was last seen by family members at his father's funeral in April 1833. (Note: James Vincent's business had made heavy losses at the time of his death; in his will he left around 800 shillings to each of his children.) On 2 May 1833, Mary Vincent married a journalist named Thomas Murphy.

== Works ==
Vincent, Crome, Cotman and Stark are considered by the art historian Herbert Minton Cundall to be the principal artists of the Norwich School of painters. Vincent's work was founded on the style of his master, and on the landscapes of the Dutch Golden Age of paintings. His works, often dated, were sometimes signed with his monogram, GV.

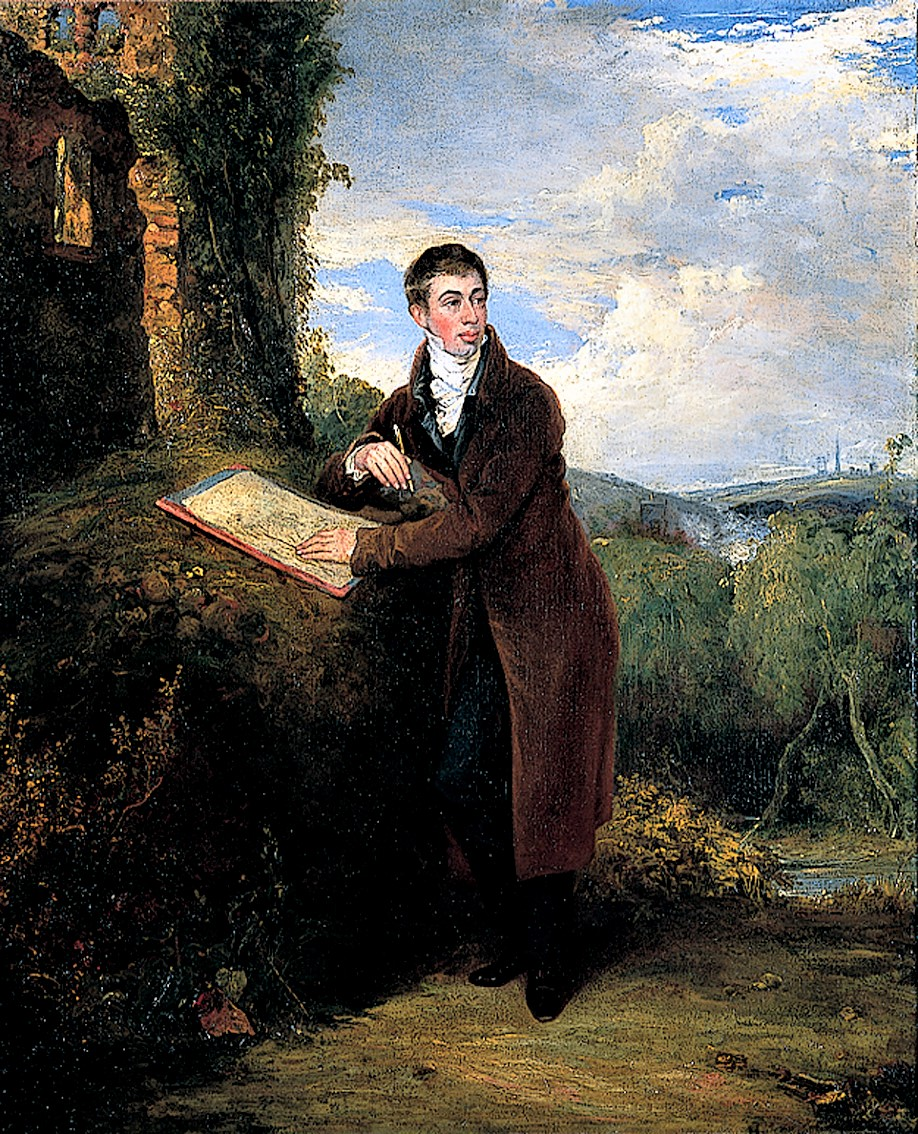
Joseph Clover's Portrait of George Vincent (1796–1832), with landscape background by himself (undated)

He exhibited from 1811 to 1831 with the Norwich Society of Artists, showing 106 pictures, including 75 landscapes, 6 seascapes and 16 "architectural works". (Note: Vincent did not exhibit in Norwich in 1819, 1824, 1826, 1827, 1829 and 1830.) He exhibited in London, Manchester and Glasgow during his career. From 1814 to 1823 he showed 9 paintings at the Royal Academy; in 1824, 1825, 1929 and 1830 he exhibited a total of 12 works at Suffolk Street, the home of the Society of British Artists; and from 1815 to 1831 a total of 41 paintings were shown at the British Institution (apart from in 1816 and 1828). His paintings were not regularly exhibited in London until he moved to the capital. They were mostly views of the Norfolk countryside, but also of Scottish scenes (from his tour of 1819), and of boats.

Vincent learnt to etch before he moved to London. Most of the Norwich artists, including Vincent, etched to produce prints for their own and their friends' interest, and not with the aim of gaining financial security. Their plates were generally untitled, as they were not intended to be published, and were first seen in posthumously made publications. The British Museum has impressions of 23 of Vincent's etchings, some in different states, made from his own pictures or sketches. Few impressions of them were taken.

Searle describes Vincent's Shipwreck on the Coast as "strikingly original". When etchings by the Norwich School were exhibited in London in 1973, his prints were described as fresh, and possessing "a forceful quality unique amongst the Norwich artists". Both Vincent and Stark tended to etch rural landscapes involving windmills, cottages animals and human figures, in a style that shows the influence of Crome and the Dutch artist Jacob Isaackszoon van Ruisdael. The historian Geoffrey Searle comments on this, sensing that their prints "descent into pictorial convention", when other members of the Norwich School—in particular the artist John Middleton—"steer clear of these picturesque contrivances".

The British Museum holds a few drawings by Vincent, once part of an album, and three drawings once attributed to him, but which are now recognised as being drawn by the Norwich artist Samuel David Colkett.

The background to Joseph Clover's undated Portrait of George Vincent (1796–1832), with landscape background by himself was painted by the sitter. The work was bequeathed to the Castle Museum in 1899 by the mustard manufacturer Jeremiah James Colman, along with Trowse Meadows, near Norwich. The Eastern Daily Press reported in 1885 that in contrast with the portrait, Vincent's actual face was "disfigured by small-pox, and that he was a very plain man. As to the latter point, we hardly think the recollection is confirmed by the portrait."

== Influences, reputation and legacy ==
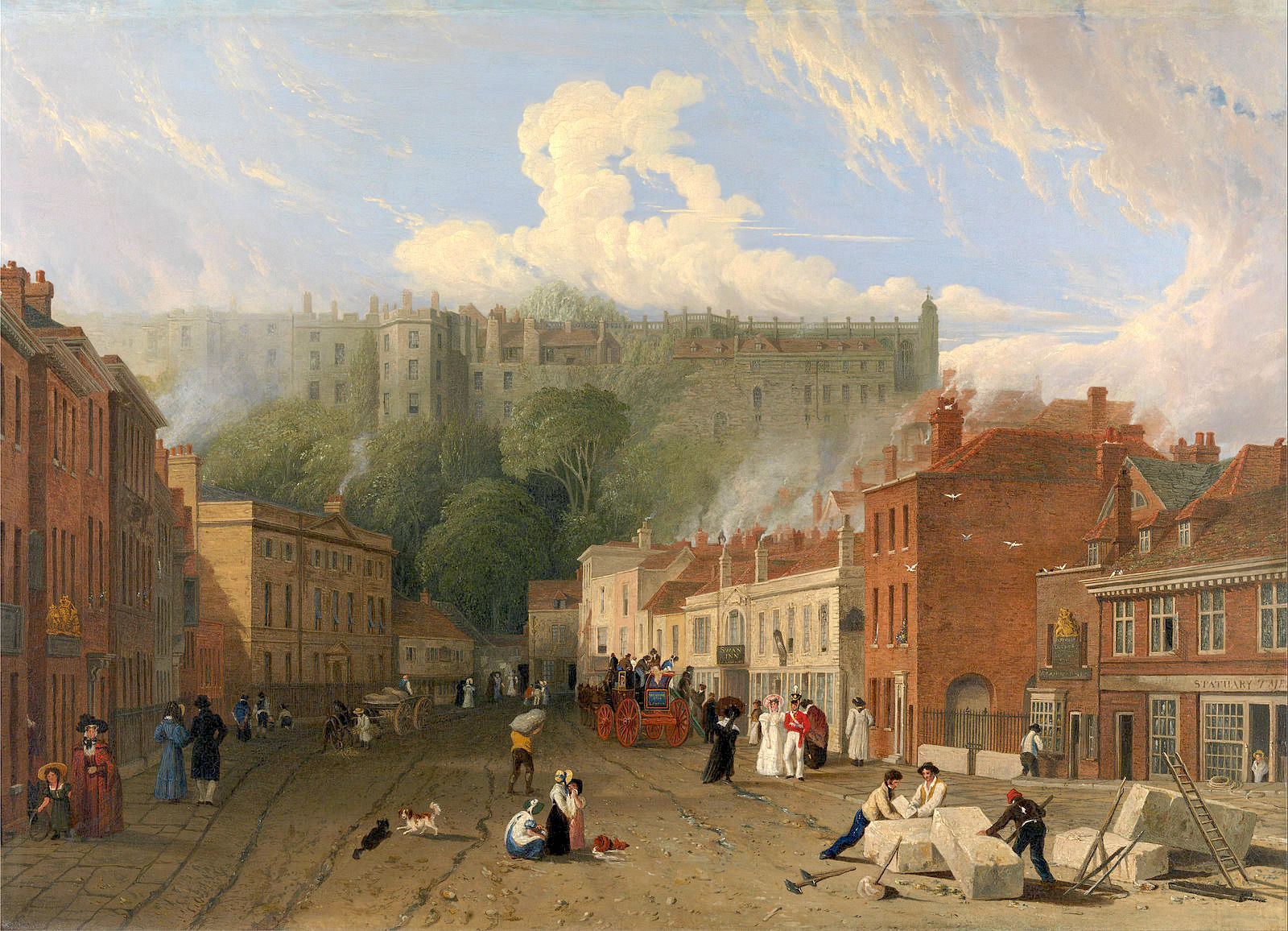
A View of Thames Street, Windsor (1827–1830), Yale Center for British Art

Vincent was influenced by Crome's paintings, among them A Fishmarket at Boulogne (1820). Dickes commented that "no other of Crome's pupil's so nearly acquired the master's wonderous power of representing atmosphere" and that his landscapes were distinguished by the quality of their composition and colouring. He provides Vincent's Road Scene and Cottage as being typical of his work, with its "ultramarine sky. amber-edged clouds, indigo in the distance, golden tree branches [and] well-drawn figures". According to the art historian Andrew Moore, Vincent approached Crome's naturalism, but was notably inferior with regard to sense of composition. His work invites comparison with the paintings of John Constable, whom he is known to have admired, and by J. M. W. Turner; both lived in London when Vincent was based there. He has also been compared favourably with Stark. According to Cundall, Vincent's paintings were more atmospheric, and he was the finer painter; according to the author and collector Derek Clifford, Vincent was the better watercolourist.

Cundall believed that had Vincent "not given way to intemperate habits he would probably have ranked amongst the foremost of British landscape painters". Moore regarded him as one of the most talented British painters of the 1820s, if inconsistent in quality. Dodgson's biographical article in the Dictionary of National Biography described him as Crome's most accomplished pupil, whose paintings constitute a remarkable body of work.

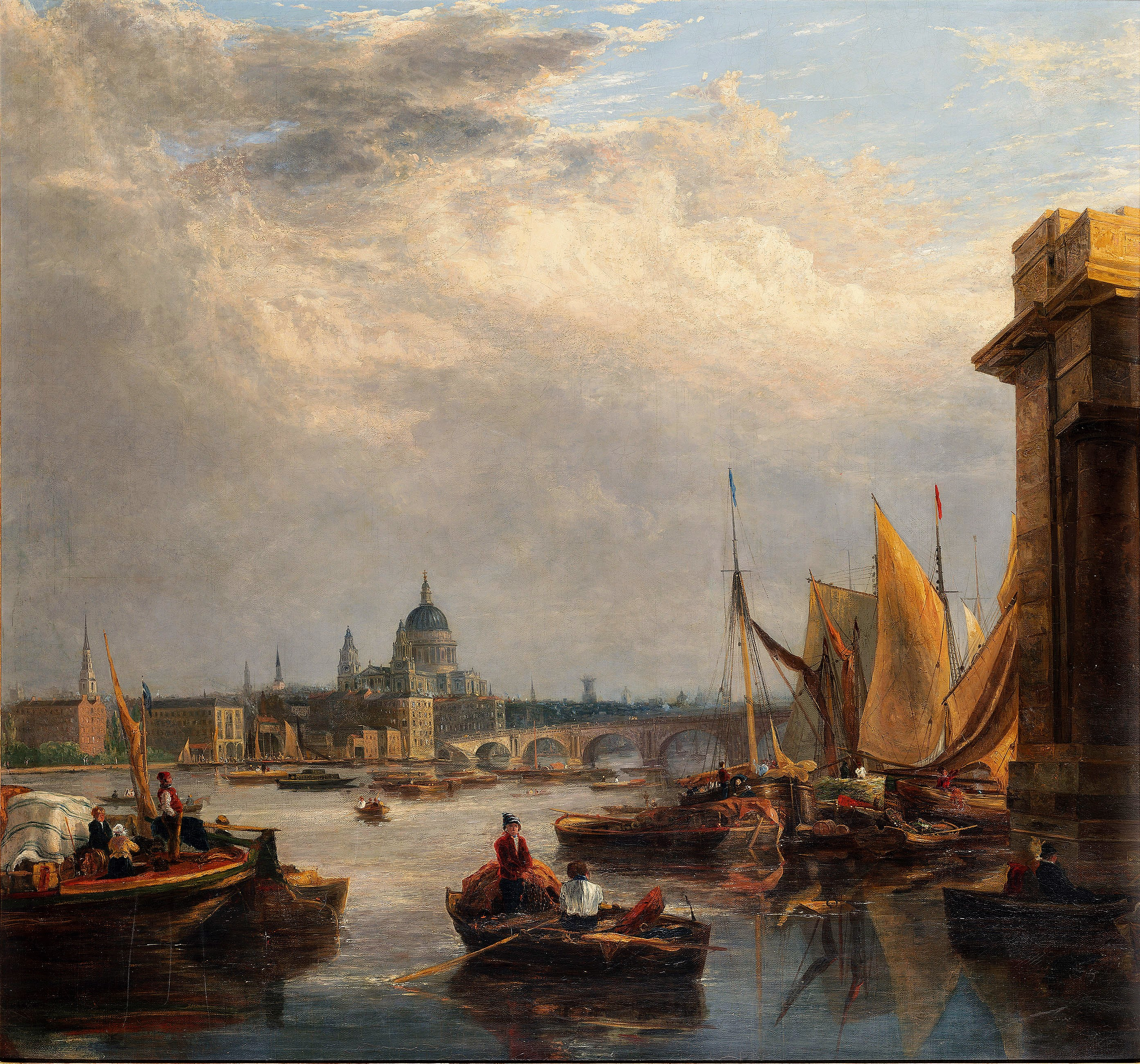
St. Paul's from the Surrey Side of Blackfriars Bridge, figures and sailing barges in the foreground (1820)

Walpole acknowledged that his output as "uneven", wrote that Vincent's death lead to the loss of an artist of ambition, still in his early years and who bore the hallmark of genius. Among the qualities she singles out are his ability to balance his pictures with unusual skies, his harmonious use of colour, and his way of producing interesting and complex works that were well thought out and constructed. She praises his Scottish oil paintings, describing them as "absolutely magnificent". The decline in his health and fortunes from the mid 1820s was to Walpole the cause of the general decline in the quality of his output from that time.

The impact of the Norwich School outside East Anglia arose largely from Vincent and Stark's work; both became important members of the second generation of the school, and their exhibitions in the capital attracted much praise in the press, with their connection with their home city only occasionally noted.

Notable works by Vincent occasionally appear at auction. St. Paul's from the Surrey Side of Blackfriars Bridge, figures and sailing barges in the foreground, an oil painting measuring 132.7 cm × 141 cm (52.2 in × 55.5 in) sold for £10,000 at Christie's in 2019, double the estimated value, and Ship Building At Greenwich, a smaller painting measuring 31 cm × 40 cm (12 in × 16 in) which was signed 'GV 1823' on the foremost boat, was sold at Bonhams in 2011 for £27,500. In comparison, Greenwich Hospital (1827) fetched 740 guineas in 1888, an amount equivalent to around £61,000 in modern currency. In 2020 an American art dealing company noted that good works by Vincent were "relatively rare".

== Selected paintings ==
=== Greenwich Hospital from the River ===
Vincent's talents as a landscape painter went largely unrecognised outside Norfolk until his 1827 work Greenwich Hospital from the River was shown at that year's International Exhibition. (Note: Vincent's painting was named Greenwich Hospital in both Campbell Dodgson's article in the Dictionary of National Biography (1899) and by Cundall, writing in 1920. Dickes, in his account of the painting and its provenance in The Norwich School of Painting (1905), used both the long and the short versions of the painting's name on the same page.) The excitement generated by the showing of this large picture helped to secure his reputation; according to Dickes, he was then "placed among the leading landscape painters". The Redgraves, in their 1890 Landmarks in Art History series, wrote that "Vincent executed the painting thoroughly, giving all his powers to the task, and he produced a noble picture."

Greenwich Hospital from the River was considered Vincent's masterpiece; being in Dickes' opinion comparable with the works of Dutch landscape painters Cuyp and Jan van de Cappelle. Dickes described the painting in his book The Norwich School of painters: "The sun is behind a golden-fringed cloud above the centre of the picture, its light suffusing the sky and powerfully reflected on the river between two groups of ships, where a timber raft is floating. In the front, dark against this light, three sailors in a boat are tying a rope to a buoy. There are other boats moving about, and in the distance between and beyond the timber ships, riverside craft and the towers of Greenwich Hospital."

It was originally commissioned for 100 guineas by a Mr Carpenter, as a result of the action of Vincent's friend, the connoisseur James Wadmore. View on the Wensum had been purchased by Wadmore in 1819 after it was shown at the British Institution, who stipulated that Carpenter should commission the picture in return for some of his important manuscripts, required by Carpenter for his own use. The commission would have provided a much-needed source of income for the artist. The painting was possibly lent by Wadmore to the Society of British Artists and exhibited in 1834. After being shown at the 1862 International Exhibition, it was sold in 1866 to a Mr Fordham of Stourton Castle, and then passed to the industrialist William Orme Foster. It was lent to another exhibition by Foster in 1877. A Spectator article of that year described the work as "a fine, vigorous painting, the drawing and grouping of the boats being first-rate, and the sky also exceptionally good".

Vincent painted Greenwich Hospital twice; a second, smaller work, also known as Greenwich Hospital, was painted in 1827.

=== Other paintings ===
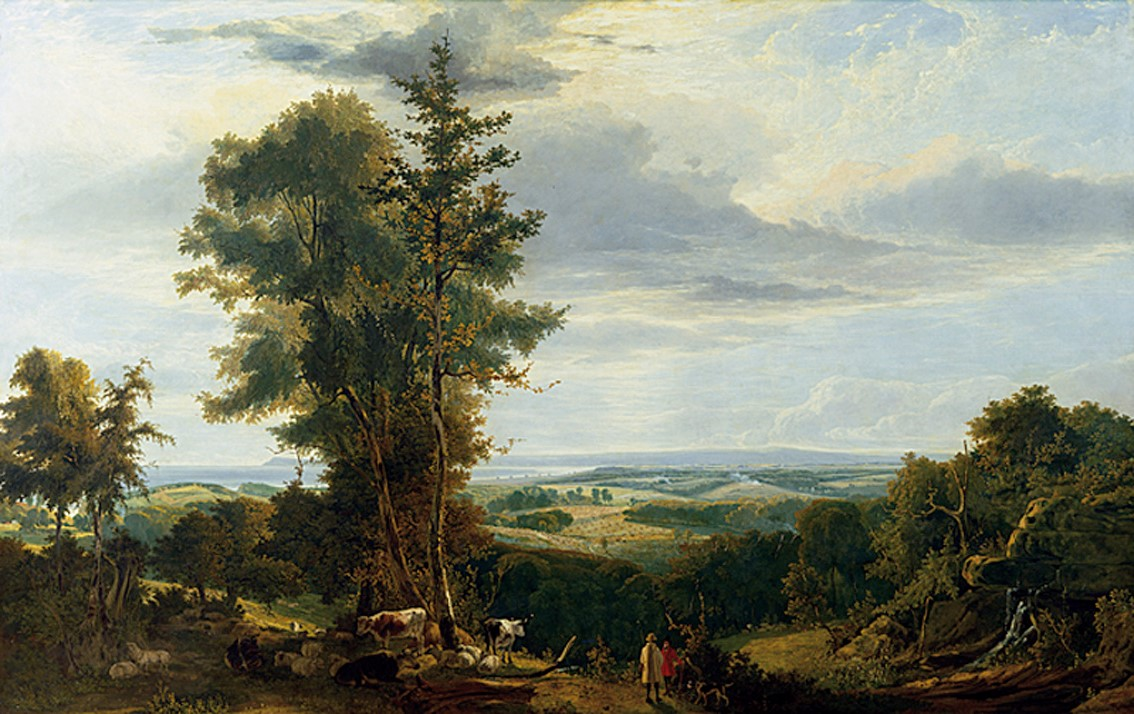
A distant view of Pevensey Bay, the landing place of King William the Conqueror (1820). Norfolk Museums Collections

A distant view of Pevensey Bay, the landing place of King William the Conqueror, painted in 1820, owes a debt to the tradition of Claude and Nicolas Poussin, as well being innovative in both style and technique. A large oil painting measuring 146 by 233.7 centimetres (4 ft 9.5 in by 7 ft 8.0 in), it was probably Vincent's most ambitious work. Hemingway and Walpole agree; in Hemingway's opinion the picture emulates Turner in its bright colouring, whilst Walpole notes that the painting has "an unmistakably Turneresque sky". Moore praises the "magnificent" panoramic view, which to him invites comparison with both Constable and Turner, who also fashionably alluded to an historical event, giving such landscapes an idyllic rural setting. The painting received very favourable reviews in the London press. The London Literary Gazette wrote that "Independent of its historical claim, this performance is a beautiful example of aerial perspective, diversified with abundant variety of picturesque forms." The painting belongs to the Norfolk Museums Collections and is on display in the art gallery at Norwich Castle. It was exhibited at the British Institution in 1824. It is one of three works depicting the bay, the others being a small drawing of fishermen, and another view of the same name painted from somewhere near Hastings, described and admired by Dickes in 1905.

Paintings by Vincent are in museums and galleries around the UK. Middle Mill, Wandsworth is part of the British Government's Art Collection and hangs in the British Embassy in Luxembourg.

At least one of his scenes has been confused with those by John Berney Crome; A View of Yarmouth from Gorleston was reputed to being by Crome when it was sold, but the mistake was discovered when a boat depicted in the picture was shown to have his initials 'GV' on the side.

The following works were critically acclaimed when first shown in public, or have been highlighted by art historians:

- Driving the Flock, St Mary's, Beverley (undated, private collection) was described enthusiastically in the Norfolk Chronicle when it was exhibited in 1820. Hemingway notes the fresh colouring, adding that the work shows Vincent "as a distinctive and original artist" at this stage in his career.
- London from the Surrey Side of Waterloo Bridge (1820) was considered by Dickes to be "an important work", and The New Monthly Magazine that year described the picture as being of "great merit", adding that the craft in the foreground "are admirably introduced to throw off the distant objects, which are represented with much truth of perspective and colour".
- Hemingway describes The Dutch Fair at Great Yarmouth ((1821) Norwich Museums Collections) as resembling Turner in its "expansive compositions and profusion of incident", and being closer to him than paintings by the Dutch masters. Moore calls it an ambitious work that shows Vincent "extending his range even beyond the scope of John Crome". The painting is on permanent display at the Tide and Time Museum in Great Yarmouth.

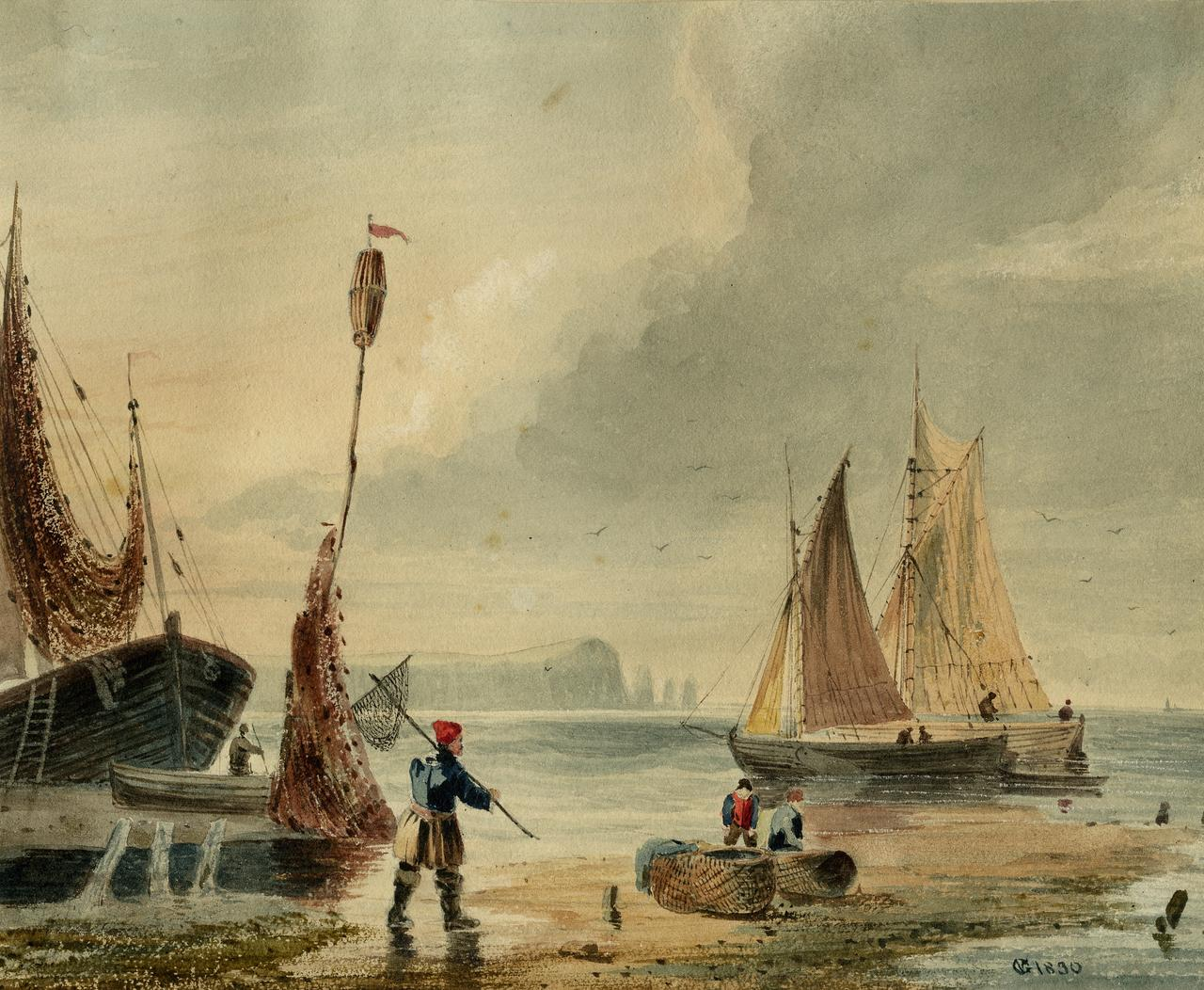
The Needles ((1830), Norfolk Museums Collections), one of Vincent's few known watercolours

- Entrance to Loch Katrine—moonlight, also called Highlanders Spearing Salmon (1825). When it was exhibited in 1825, this oil painting was described by the Norfolk Chronicle as "capital"; in 1985, Andrew Moore wrote that Vincent's stated ambition of producing 'Rembrant effects' in a painting was achieved here It was described by Dickes as "magnificent and Crome-like", and by Hemingway as the most romantic of Vincent's Scottish scenes. The painting is held by Norfolk Museums Collections.
- Trowse Meadows, near Norwich (1828), Norwich Museums Collections. A painting admired by the artist John Thirtle, who made a watercolour from it. Hemingway rates It as one of the most impressive of Vincent's late works, comparing it to John Constable's The Hay Wain (1821). According to Hemingway, it lacks the transparency and glitter of the Constable painting, but "the perspective of the clouds, the light effect and the atmospheric recession are all superbly suggested".
- The Needles (1830) Norwich Museums Collections
- View from Sandlings Ferry (undated). The Athenæum reported the painting to be one of the best in the Royal Academy Winter Exhibition of 1878. The Builder also praised the work that year, saying it "...has a good deal of quiet beauty". Writing in 1905, Dickes praised the work, noting "This picture is remarkable for its pearly atmosphere. A tender vapour seems to pervade the scene."

=== Gallery ===
==== Oils ====
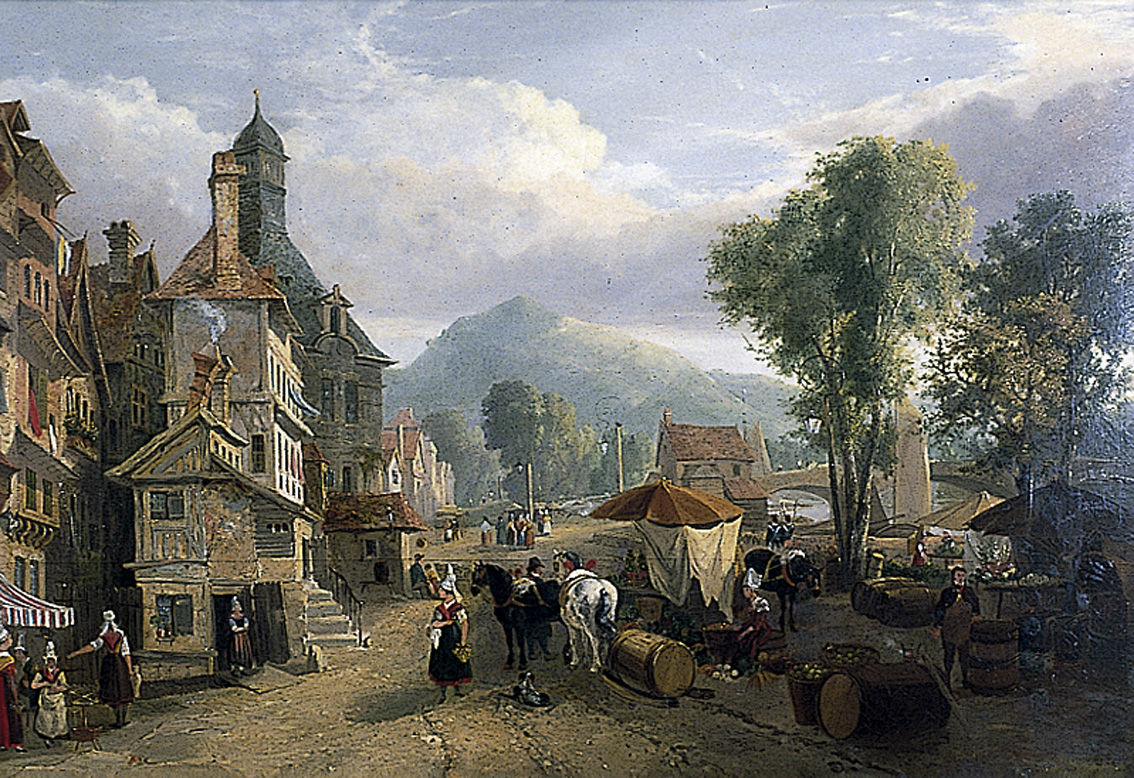
Rouen (1816), Norfolk Museums Collections

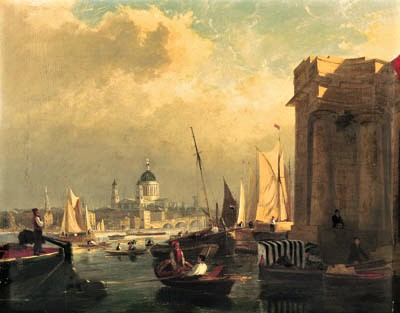
London from the Surrey Side of Waterloo Bridge (1820)

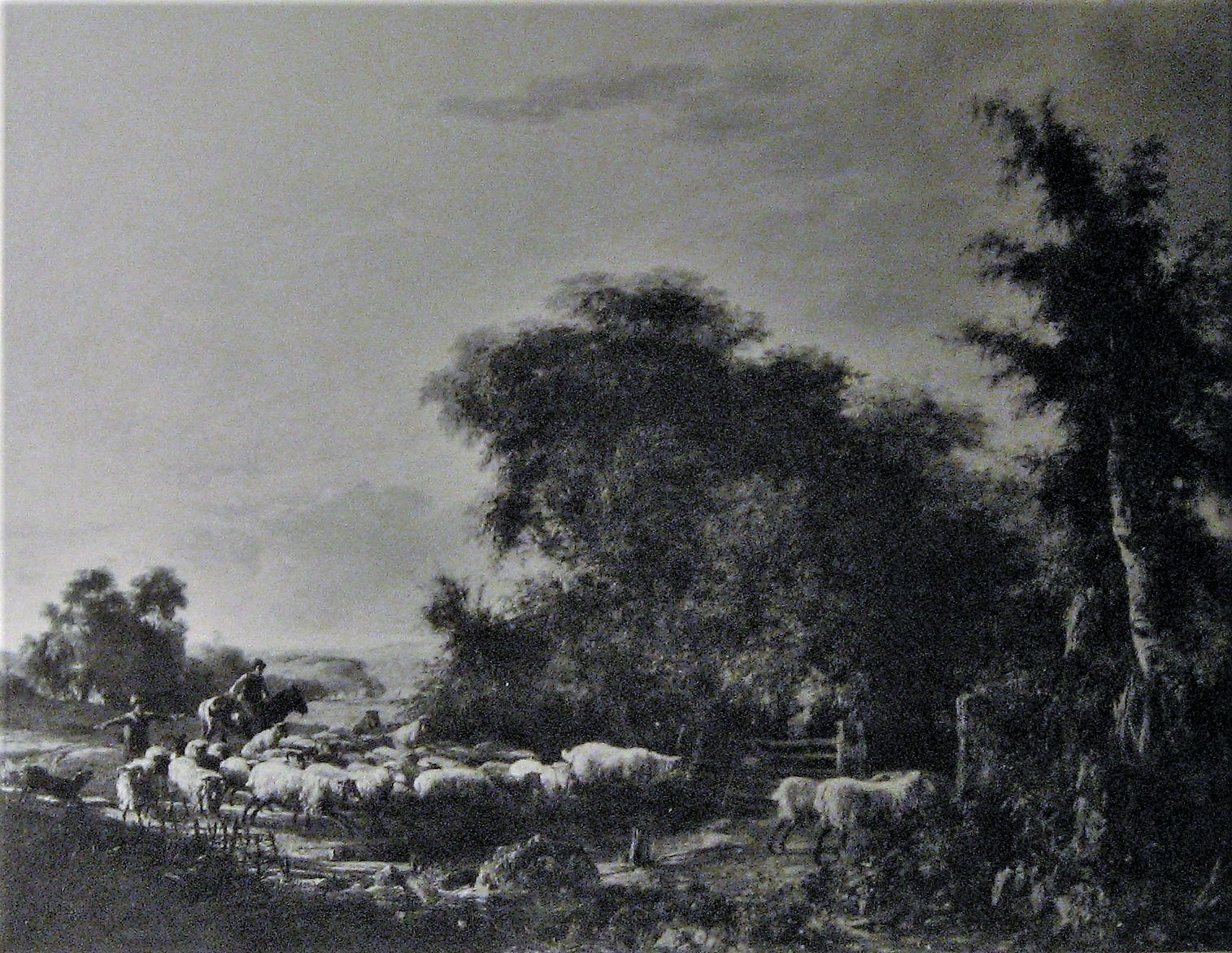
Driving the Flock, St Mary's, Beverley (exhibited in 1820), private collection

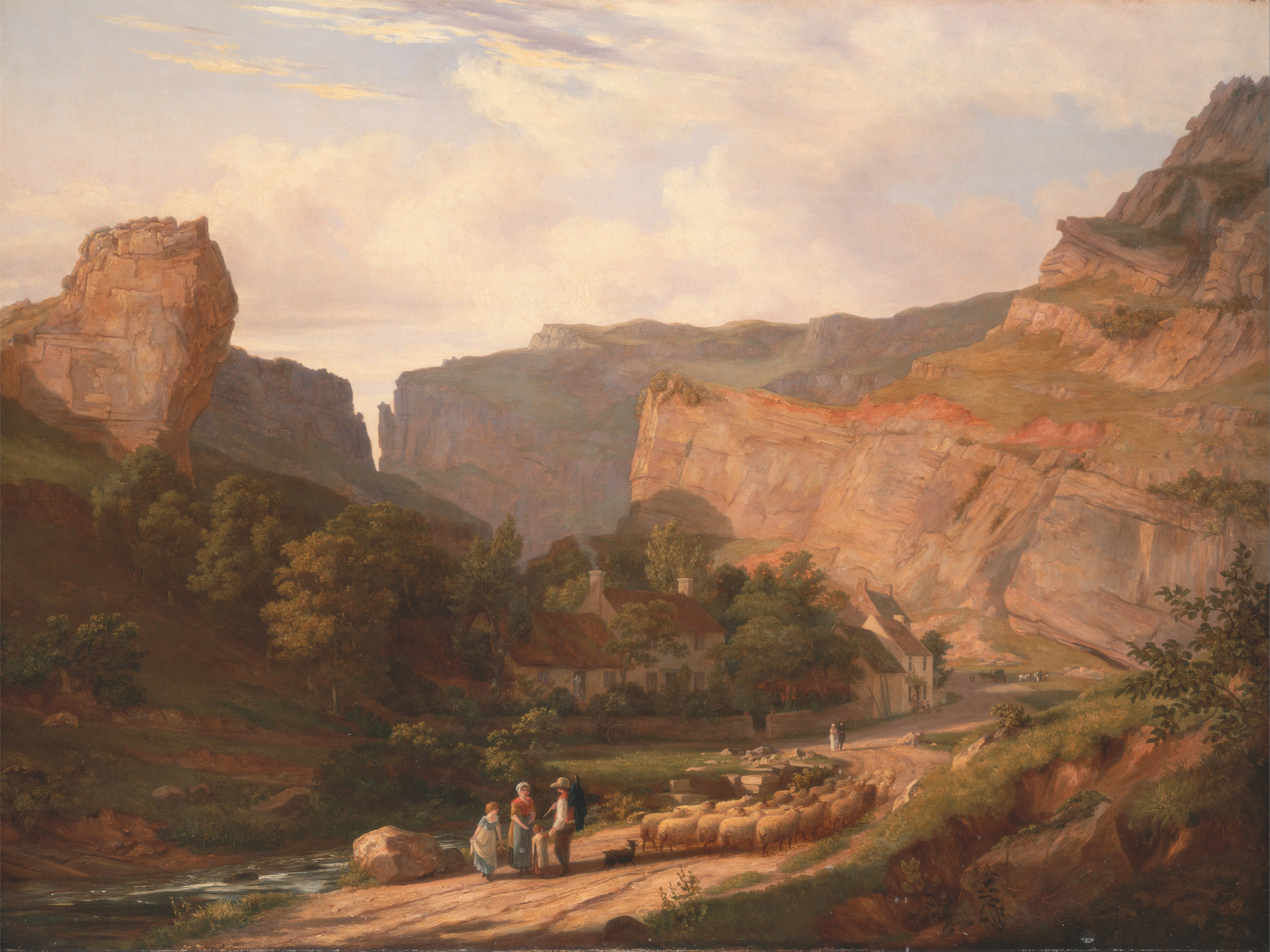
A View of Cheddar Gorge (c.1820), Yale Center for British Art

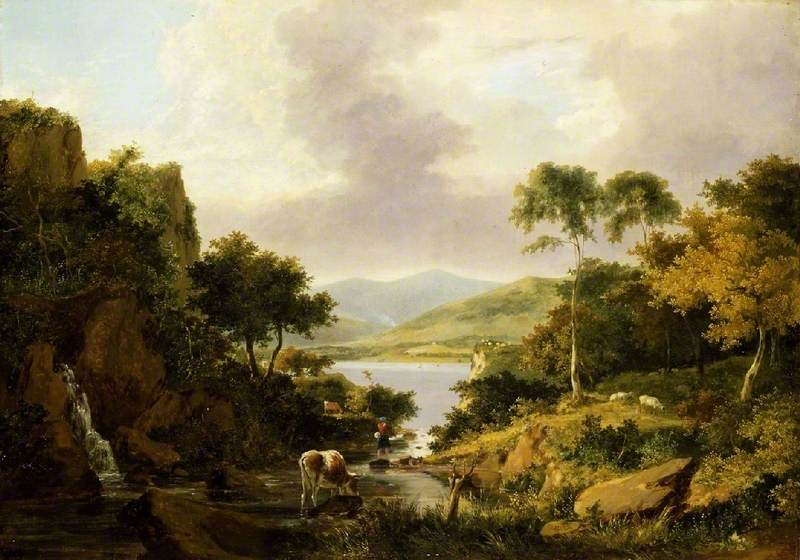
Loch Etive, Argyllshire (1821), Fitzwilliam Museum

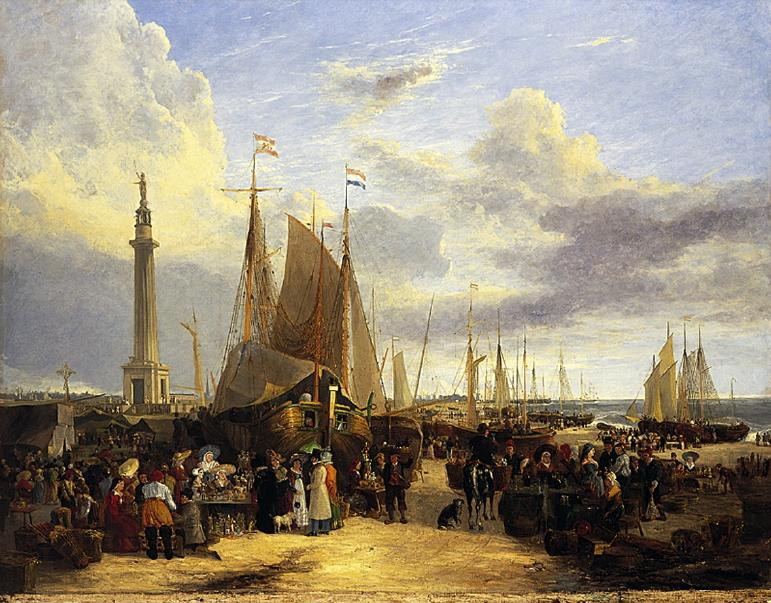
The Dutch Fair at Great Yarmouth (1821), Norfolk Museums Collections

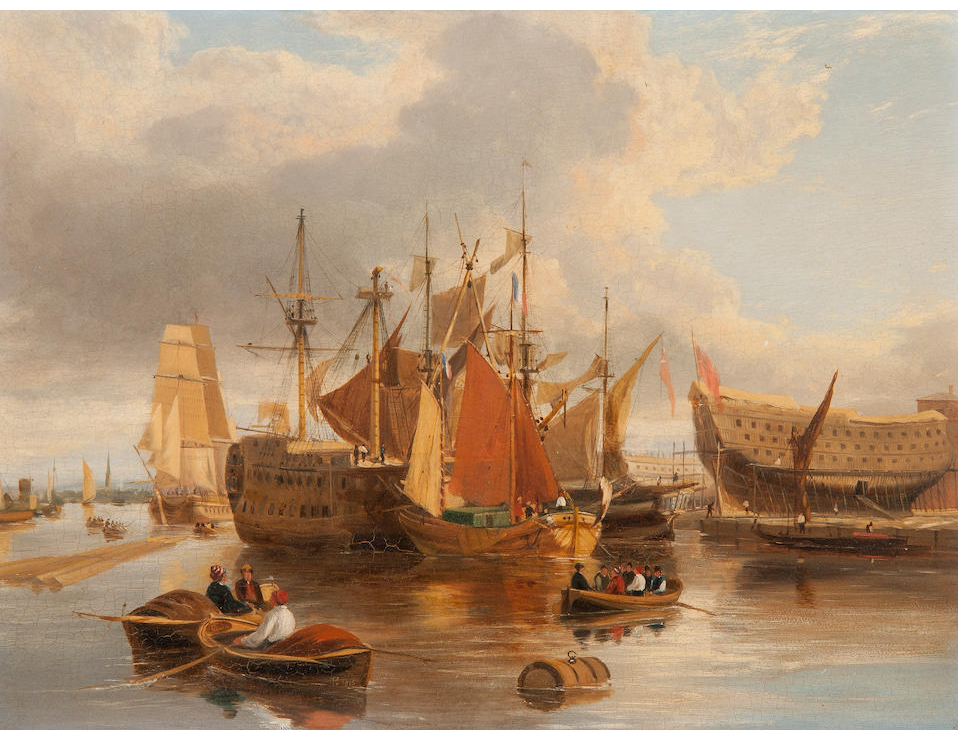
Ship Building at Greenwich (1823)

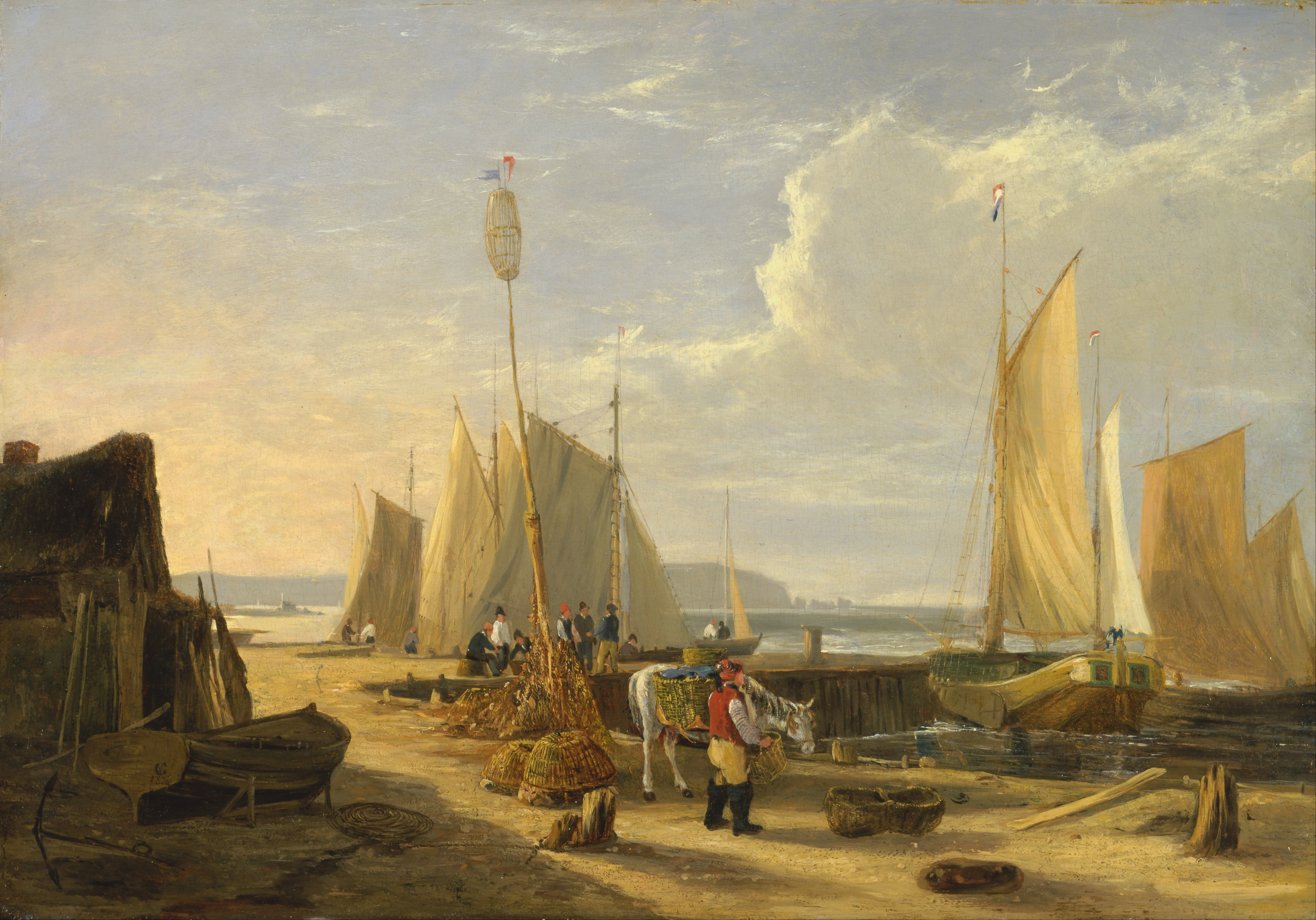
A Harbour Scene in the Isle of Wight, Looking Towards the Needles (1824), Yale Center for British Art

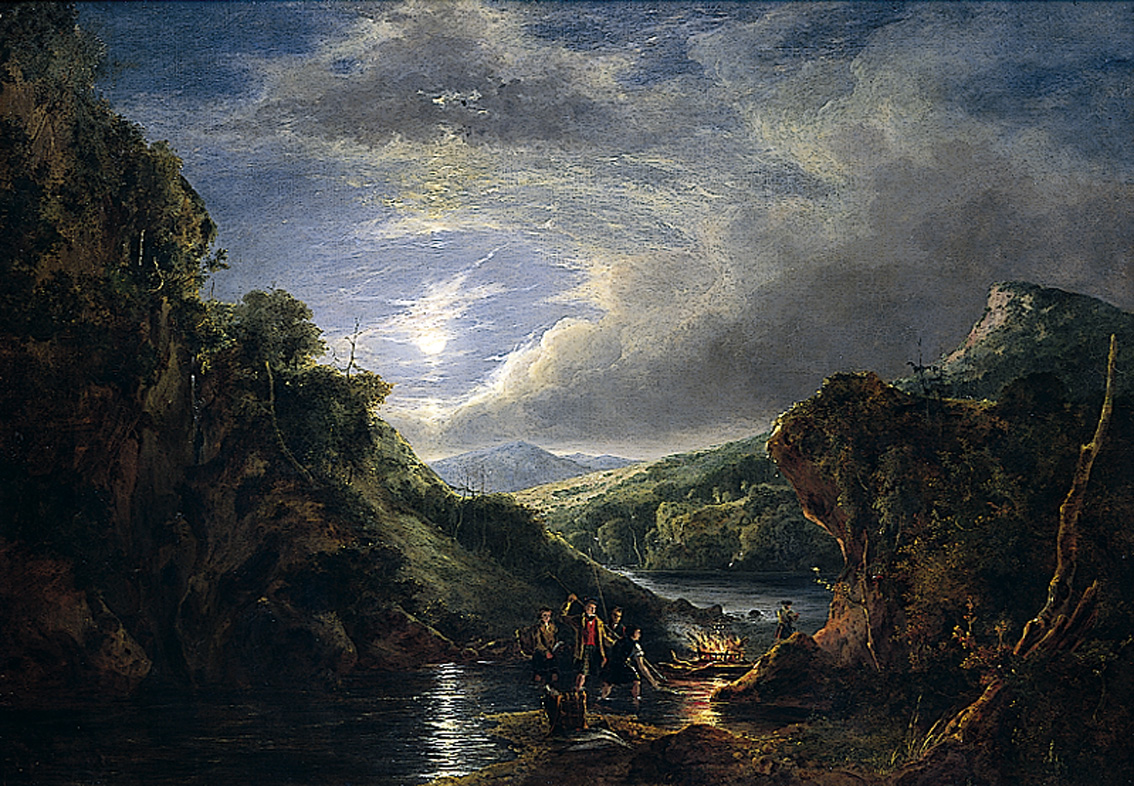
Entrance to Loch Katrine, Moonlight, Highlanders Spearing Salmon (1825), Norfolk Museums Collections

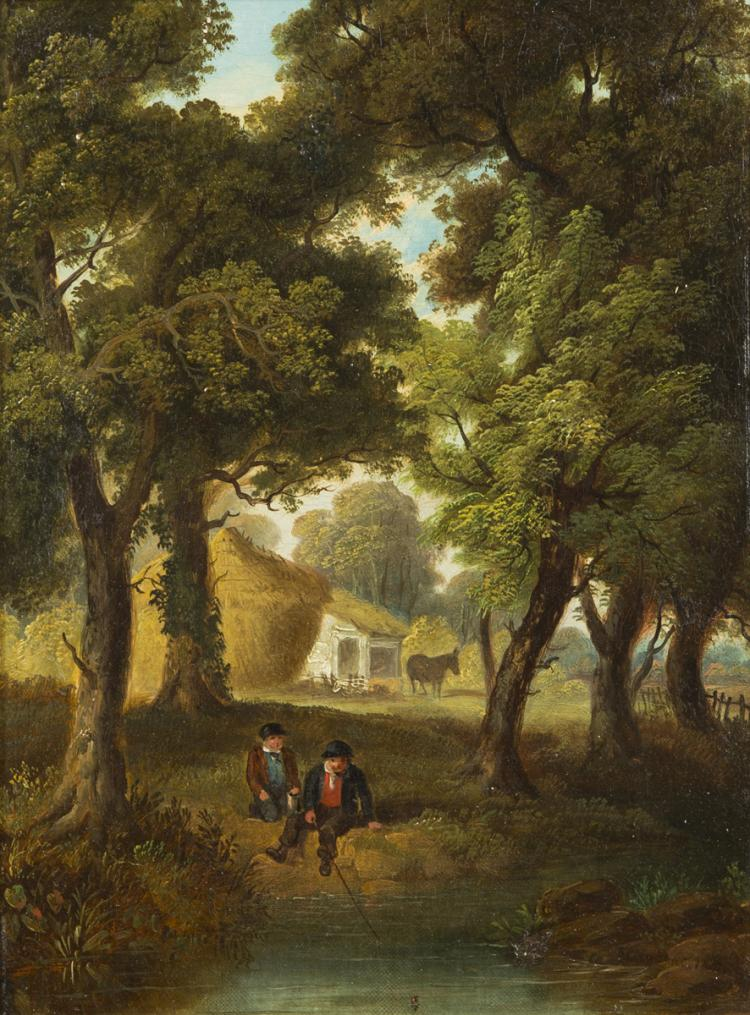
A Quiet Pool (undated)

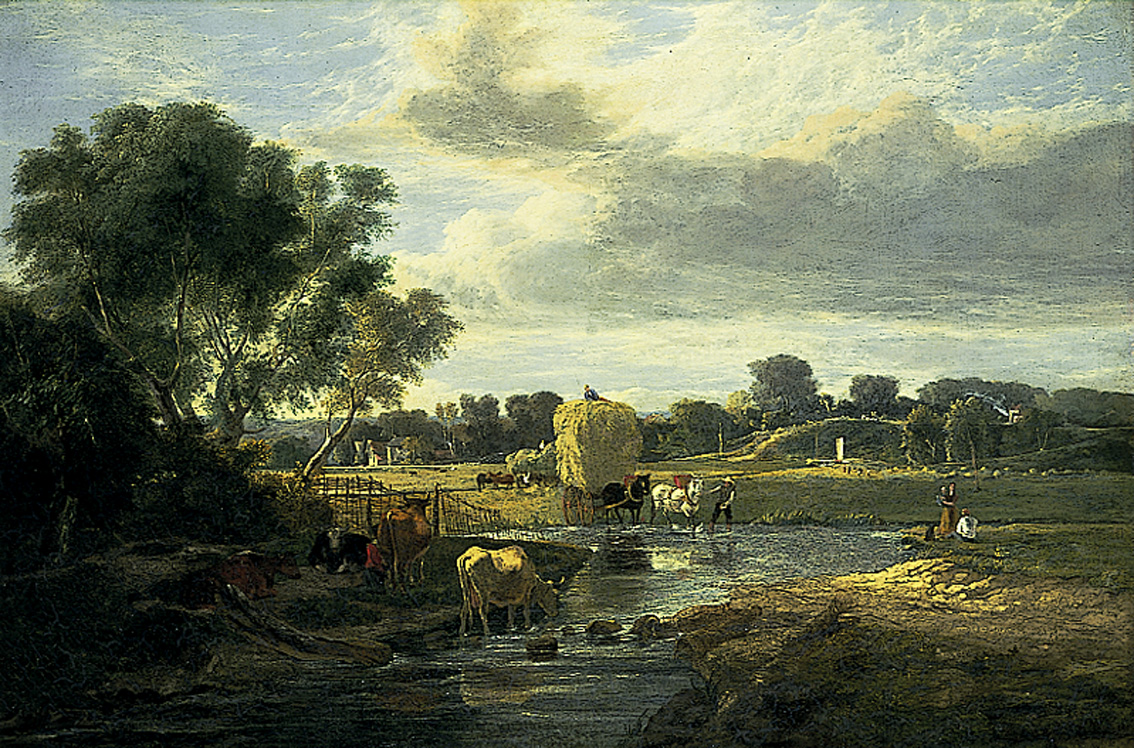
Trowse Meadows, near Norwich (undated), Norfolk Museums Collections. (Note: The painting is an example of a work originally framed by Vincent's contemporary, John Thirtle.)

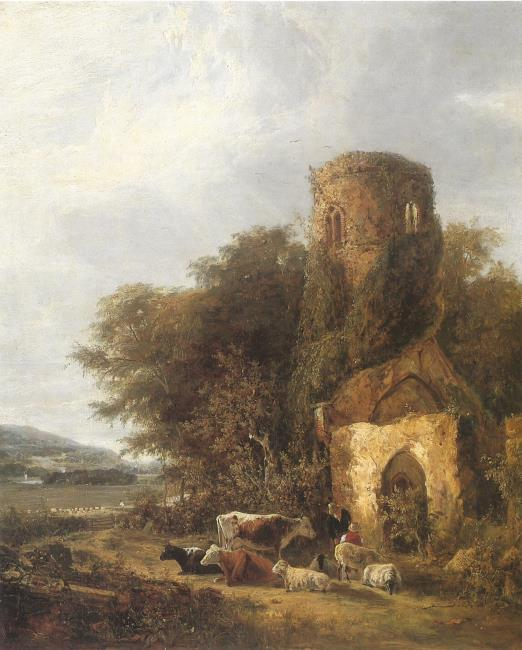
Landscape with the ruins of Whitlingham Church, near Norwich (undated)

==== Etchings ====
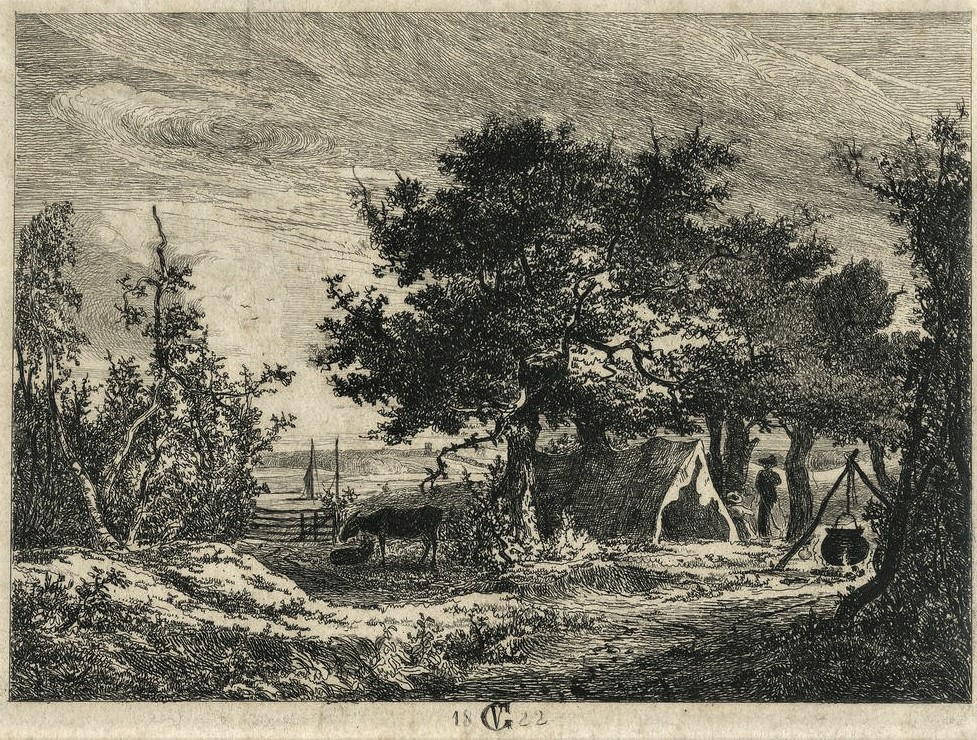
A Gypsy Encampment (1822), Norfolk Museums Collections

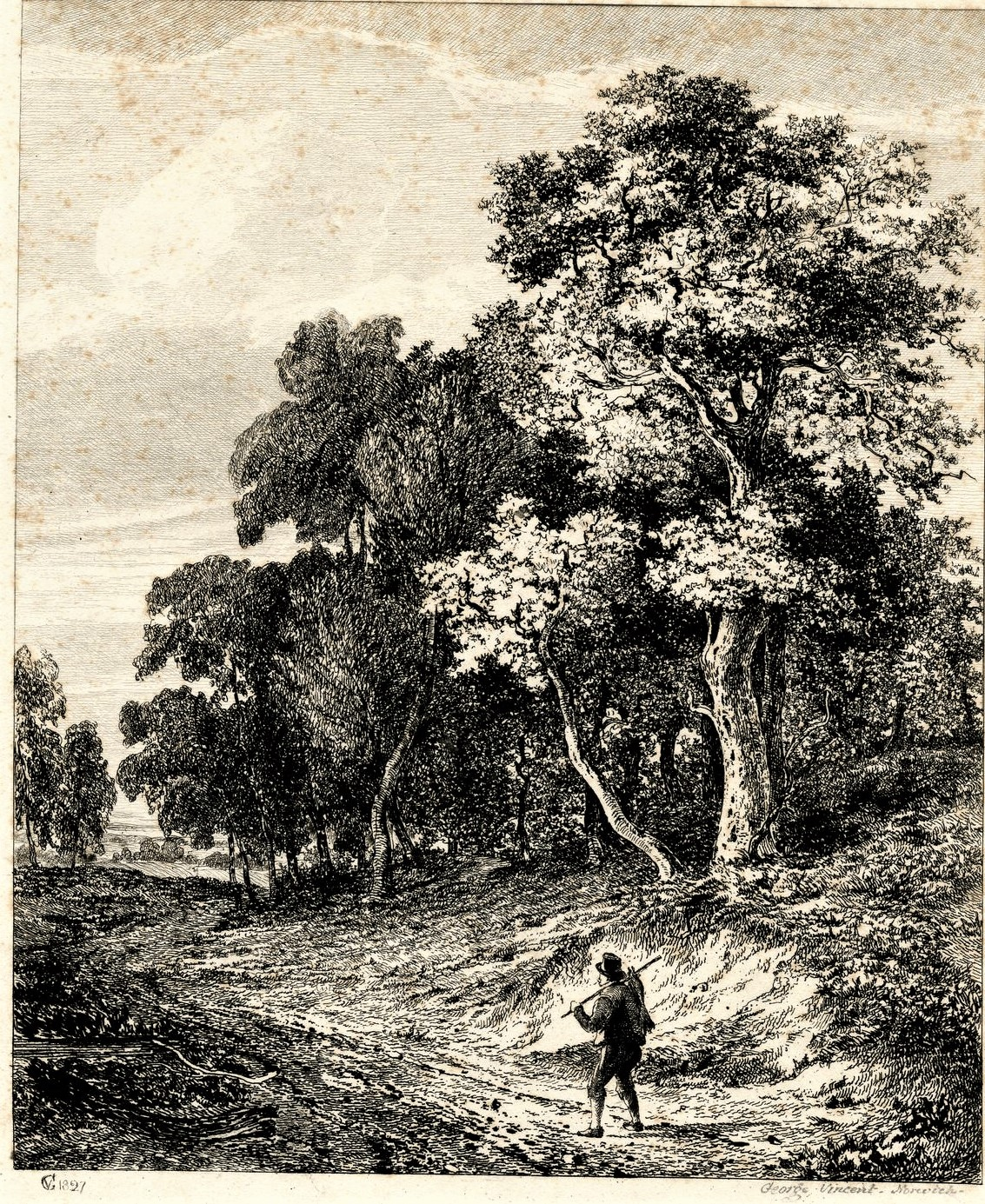
(c.1826), British Museum

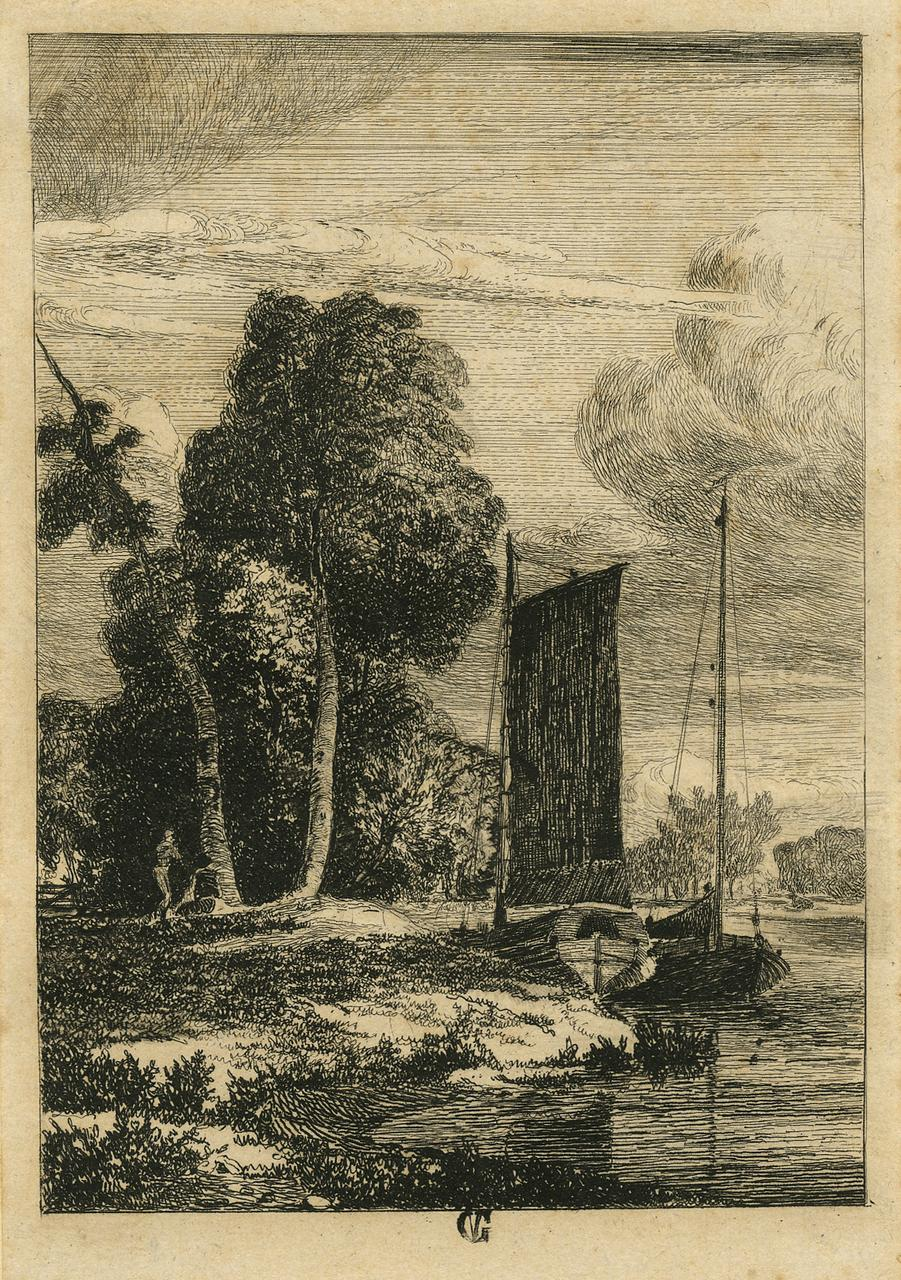
Whitlingham (undated), Norfolk Museums Collections

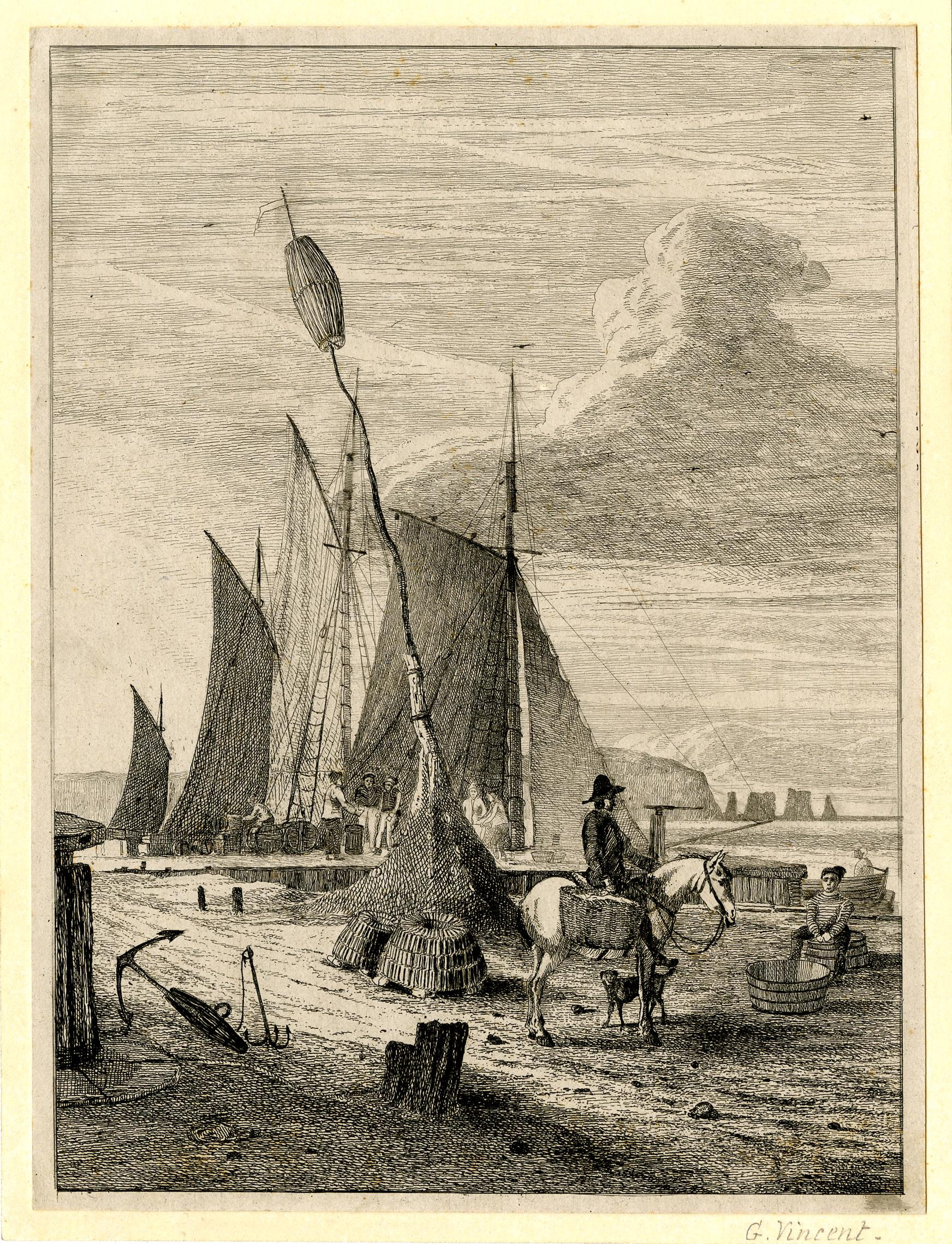
(undated), British Museum

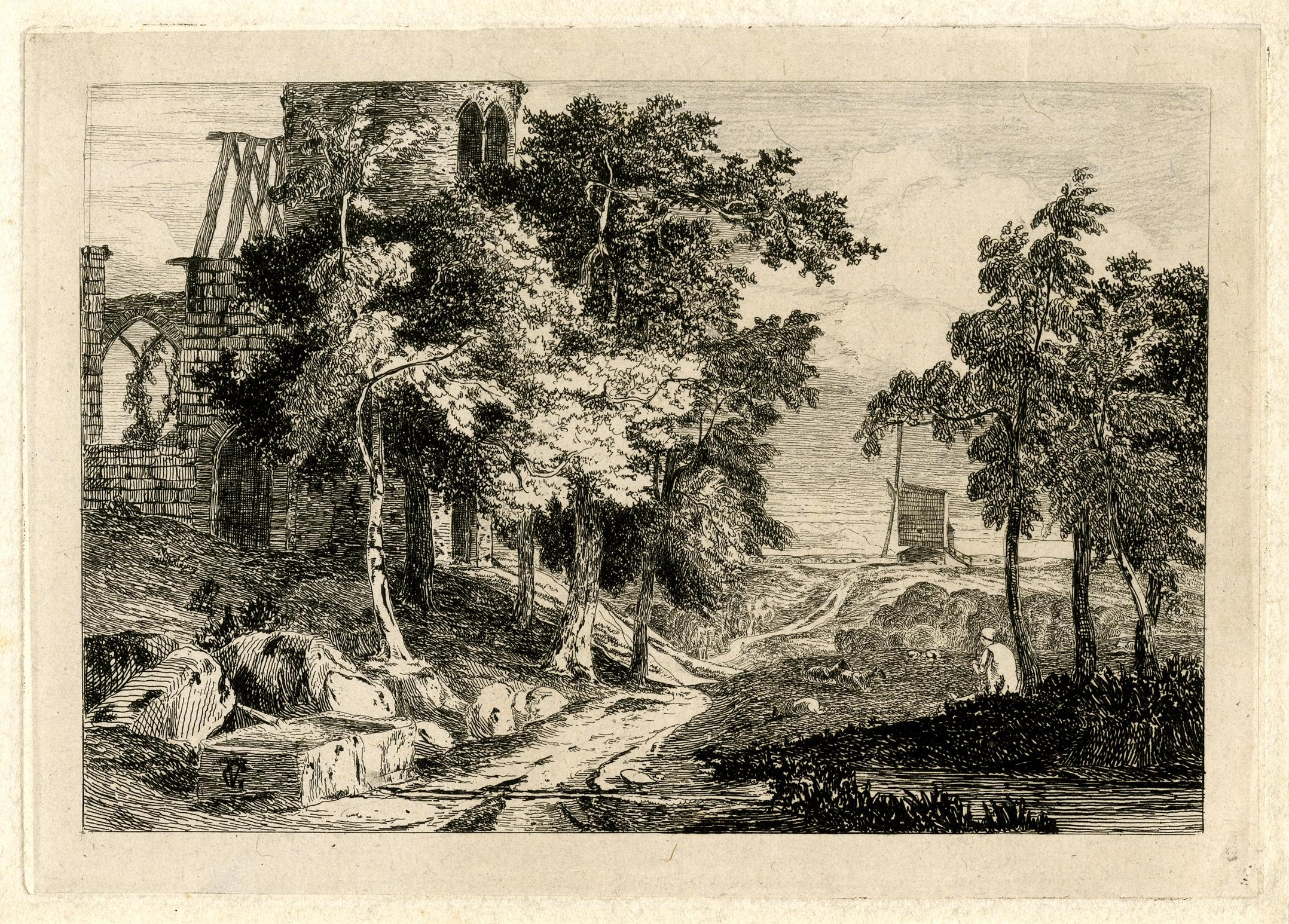
Trees and Ruin (undated), British Museum

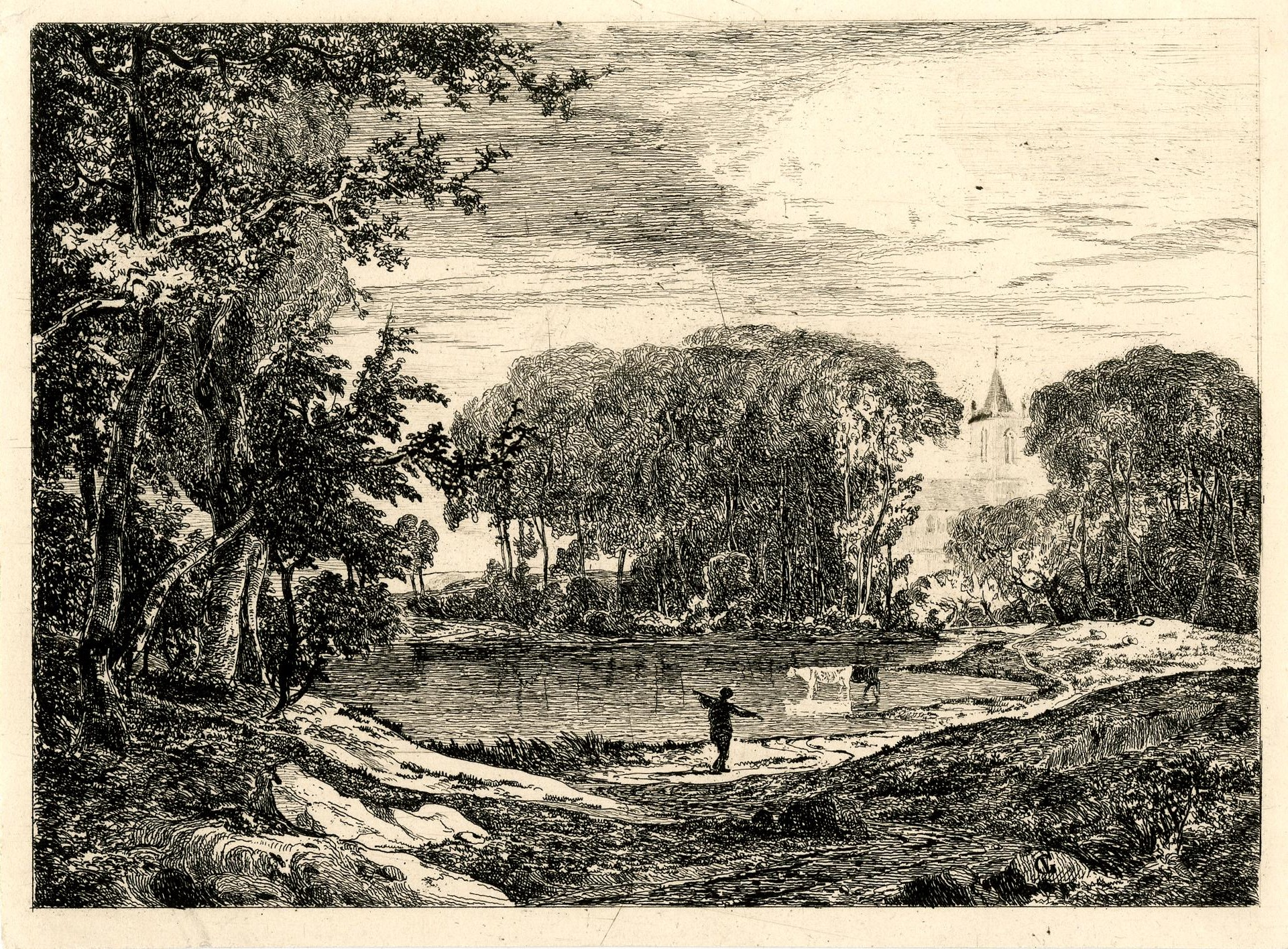
(undated), British Museum

== Bibliography ==
- Bottinelli, Giorgia, ed. (2013). A Vision of England: Paintings of the Norwich School. Norwich: Norfolk Museums & Archaeological Service. ISBN 978-0-903101-82-0.
- Clifford, Derek Plint (1965). Watercolours of the Norwich School. London: Cory, Adams & Mackay. OCLC 1624701.
- Cundall, Herbert Minton (1920). The Norwich School. London: Geoffrey Holme Ltd. OCLC 651802612.
- Day, Harold (1978). East Anglian Painters. Vol. 2. Eastbourne: Eastbourne Fine Art. ISBN 978-0-902010-10-9.
- Dickes, William Frederick (1905). The Norwich school of painting: being a full account of the Norwich exhibitions, the lives of the painters, the lists of their respective exhibits and descriptions of the pictures. Norwich: Jarrold & Sons Ltd. OCLC 558218061.
- Dodgson, Campbell (1899). "Dictionary of National Biography, 1885-1900/Vincent, George" . In Lee, Sidney (ed.). Dictionary of National Biography. Vol. 58. London: Smith, Elder & Co. pp. 357–358.
- Dodgson, Campbell; Watt, Norma (23 September 2004). "Vincent, George". In Watt, Norma (ed.). Oxford Dictionary of National Biography (online ed.). Oxford: Oxford University Press. doi:10.1093/ref:odnb/28308. (Subscription, Wikipedia Library access or UK public library membership required.)
- Graves, Algernon (1905). The Royal Academy of Arts: a complete dictionary of contributors and their work from its foundation in 1769 to 1904. Vol. VIII (Toft to Zwecker). London: Henry Graves and Co. Ltd.; George Bell and Sons. OCLC 403069.
- Graves, Algernon (1908). The British Institution, 1806–1867; a complete dictionary of contributors and their work from the foundation of the institution. London: G. Bell and Sons and A. Graves. OCLC 906116975.
- Hemingway, Andrew (1979). The Norwich School of Painters, 1803-33. Oxford: Phaidon. ISBN 978-0-7148-2001-9.
- Hemingway, Andrew (2017). Landscape Between Ideology and the Aesthetic: Marxist Essays on British Art and Art Theory, 1750–1850. Leiden; Boston: Brill. ISBN 978-90-04-26900-2.
- Hooker, Joseph Dalton (1903). A Sketch of the Life and Labours of Sir William Jackson Hooker, Late Director of the Royal Gardens of Kew. New York: Cambridge University Press. ISBN 978 1-108-01932-3.
- Moore, Andrew W. (1985). The Norwich School of Artists. London: HMSO/Norwich Museums Service. ISBN 978-0-903101-48-6.
- Moore, Andrew (1988). Dutch and Flemish painting in Norfolk: a history of taste and influence, fashion and collection. London: HMSO. ISBN 9-780-11701-061-1.
- Mottram, Ralph Hale (1931). John Crome of Norwich. London: John Lane The Bodley Head Ltd. OCLC 145422947.
- Rajnai, Miklos; Stevens, Mary (1976). The Norwich Society of Artists, 1805–1833: a dictionary of contributors and their work. Norwich: Norfolk Museums Service for the Paul Mellon Centre for Studies in British Art. ISBN 978-0-903101-29-5.
- Redgrave, Richard; Redgrave, Samuel (1890). A Century of British Painters. New York: Cornell University Press. ISBN 978-0-8014-9217-4.
- The Royal Academy (1877). 1877 – Old Masters and deceased masters of the British School, 1877. London: The Royal Academy. OCLC 213555189.
- Searle, Geoffrey R. (2015). Etchings of the Norwich School. Norwich: Lasse Press. ISBN 978-0-9568758-9-1.
- Temple, Philip; Thom, Colin; Saint, Andrew (2017). "The Berners Estate: Berners and Newman Streets" (PDF). Survey of London: South-East Marylebone (volumes 51 and 52). New Haven: Yale University Press. ISBN 978-0-300-22197-8.
- Viardot, Louis (1877). An Illustrated History of Painters of All Schools. London: S. Low, Marston, Searle, & Rivington. OCLC 9181273.
- Walpole, Josephine (1997). Art and Artists of the Norwich School. Woodbridge: Antique Collectors' Club Holme. ISBN 978-1-85149-261-9.
- Young, John (1825). A catalogue of pictures by British artists in the possession of Sir John Fleming Leicester, Bart.: with etchings from the whole collection, including the pictures in his gallery at Tabley house, Cheshire. London: Published by the proprietor. OCLC 311923507.
