= List of works by George Vincent =

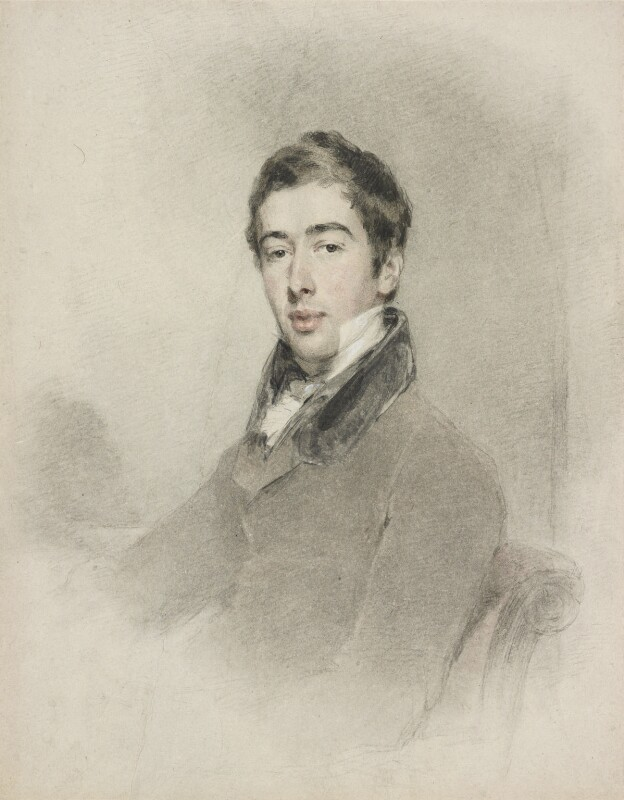
John Jackson, George Vincent, c. 1820, watercolour, National Portrait Gallery, London

This is an incomplete list of works by George Vincent. The British artist George Vincent (June 1796 – c.1832). was one of the most talented of the Norwich School of painters; his work was founded on the Dutch School of landscape painting as well as the style of John Crome. The school's reputation outside East Anglia in the 1820s was based largely upon the works of him and his friend James Stark.

Vincent was educated at Norwich Grammar School and afterwards apprenticed to Crome. He exhibited in London and elsewhere, and from 1811 until 1831 showed works with the Norwich Society of Artists, exhibiting more than a 100 pictures of Norfolk landscapes and marine works. By 1818 he had relocated to London and had obtained the patronage of wealthy clients, but then began to struggle financially. His financial problems led to his incarceration in the Fleet Prison for debt in 1824.

After 1831, Vincent disappeared and his whereabouts after this date remain uncertain. His death may have occurred before April 1832, perhaps in Bath. His picture Greenwich Hospital from the River was shown in London three decades after his death and caused renewed interest in his paintings and helped to establish his reputation as a leading member of the Norwich School. The art historian Herbert Minton Cundall wrote in the 1920s that had Vincent "not given way to intemperate habits he would probably have ranked amongst the foremost of British landscape painters".

== Etchings ==
Key
BM—work held at the British Museum in London
NMC—work held by the Norfolk Museums Collections, based at Norwich Castle
O—work held elsewhere.

Image	Title	Date	Locations	Commentary	known states
	A Gypsy Encampment	1822	NMC, BM		2
	Shipwreck on the coast		BM		2
	Trees and ruin		BM		4
	View of a harbour		BM		4
	View of a ruin		BM		4
	View of a rural path		BM		5
	View of a rural path from the left		BM		5
	View on the Yare, Afternoon		BM	Titled The River Yare and On the Yare, View of Norwich (NMC)	2 (NMC); 3 (BM)
	View with a figure standing at the gate of a cottage		NMC		1
	View with a large tree in the left foreground		NMC		1
	View with a path in the centre leading to a river		NMC		4
	View with two cows walking in the foreground		NMC		4
	Whitlingham		NMC		5
	Whitlingham		NMC		2
	Woodland and figures		BM	Titled Group of trees with figure in roadway by NMC	1 (NMC); 5 (BM)

== Oil paintings ==
Image	Title	Date	Technique	height x width (cm)	Location	Commentary
	A Distant View of Pevensey Bay, the Landing Place of King William the Conqueror	1824	Oil on canvas	14.61 x 233.6	Norwich Museums Collections	View of Beachy Head from Pevensey – "Vincent's most ambitious painting"; its "bright colouring and magnificent panoramic space" emulated J. M. W. Turner. (Hemingway) Moore suggests that the "magnificence" of the view depicted by Vincent can be compared with both Constable and Turner. "one of his most ambitious oils" (Walpole)
	A Harbour Scene in the Isle of Wight, Looking Towards the Needles	1824	Oil on panel	39.1 x 55.9	Yale Center for British Art, Paul Mellon Collection (United States)	
	An English Farmstead		oil on canvas	101.5 x 127	Wolverhampton Art Gallery	(attributed to)
	An Old Farmstead near Norwich		oil on canvas	76.8 x 63.5		
	A Norfolk Cottage		oil on panel	43.2 x 59.7		Sold at Keys in 2016. A photograph of a similar composition entitled View Near Cromer, signed and dated 1827, is in the Witt Library of the Courtauld Institute of Art.
	A Norfolk Mill		Oil on panel	32.8 x 24.2	Museums Sheffield	
	A Quiet Pool		Oil on panel	30.5 x 22.9		
	A Shady country road		Oil on canvas	20.3 x 25.7	Victoria and Albert Museum	As part of an analysis of the painting's provenance by the Victoria and Albert Museum, the painting is a copy, and the whereabouts of the original by Vincent is unknown. According to the V&A, the painting has been convincingly attributed to John Joseph Cotman. In 1905, Dickes did not doubt that it was Vincent's.
	A Shady Pool		Oil on oak panel	30.4 x 25.4	Norwich Museums Collections	
	A View near Thorpe, Norwich				Sheffield Museums	
	A View of Cheddar Gorge	c.1820	Oil on canvas	91.4 x 121.9	Yale Center for British Art, Paul Mellon Collection (United States)	
	A View of Suffolk		oil on canvas	90.6 x 113.4	Museums Sheffield	
	A View of Thames Street, Windsor		oil on canvas	67.6 x 93.3	Yale Center for British Art (United States)	
	A View to Canterbury, Kent		Oil on canvas	62 x 75		Sold at auction, Previously with Newhouse Galleries, New York
	After the storm		Oil on canvas	75 x 125.5		Sold at Bonhams in 2015 (fetched £625)
	Alum Bay, Isle of Wight					"exceptional example of the work of Crome's pupil, George Vincent..." (Walpole, Art and Artists of the Norwich School): painting reproduced p. 45.
	Beechy Head and the Martello Towers looking over Hastings from Fairlight		Oil on board	38 x 49		Sold at Bonhams in 2015 (fetched £812)
	Bramerton, Woods End, near Thorpe, Norfolk	1821	Oil on canvas		Bolton Art Gallery	
	Brancepeth Castle, Durham		oil on canvas	27.9 x 43.2		Sold at Keys in 2011 for £1500.
	Castle Ashby, Northamptonshire		Oil on canvas	35.1 x 46.5	Newstead Abbey	
	Cattle and sheep crossing a ford, a distant view of Norwich beyond				Inland Revenue Register of Conditionally Exempt Works of Art	
	Cattle Drinking		oil on canvas	49.8 x 75.1	Museums Sheffield	
	Cattle grazing before a windmill		Oil on panel	32 x 43		Sold at Bonhams in 2003 (fetched £2937)
	Coast Scene with Rivers and Boats				Lady Lever Art Gallery	
	Country Lane with Figures by a Cottage		oil on canvas	24.3 x 33		Sold at Keys in 2011 for £270.
	Driving the Flock, St Mary's, Beverley		Oil on canvas	101.6 x 127	Private collection	Also known as Driving the Flock, St Mary's, Beverley. Exhibited in 1820 under the title Sheep Crossing a Brook, "freshly coloured" and already showing Vincent's ability to be original and distinctive. (Hemingway)
	Dutch Fair on Yarmouth Beach (The Dutch Fair at Great Yarmouth)		Oil on canvas	130 x 162	Norwich Museums Collections	Hemingway describes the work as being "on a much more ambitious scale than Crome's" and compares it with Turner's St Mawes at the Pilchard Season.
	English landscape with a windmill				Victoria Art Gallery, Bath, Somerset	
	Entrance to Loch Katrine – moonlight; Highlanders Spearing Salmon	1825	Oil on canvas	76.8 x 107.9	Norwich Museums Collections	Regarded by the Norfolk Chronicle 6 August 1825 as "capital"; Vincent's stated ambition of producing 'Rembrant effects' in a painting was achieved here. (Moore) Described by Hemingway as the most romantic of Vincent's Scottish scenes, and by Dickes as "magnificent and Crome-like".
	Evening Twilight		Oil on canvas	67.9 x 91.4	Nottingham Castle Museum and Art Gallery	(attributed)
	Farmyard Scene				Haworth Art Gallery	
	Figures in a Wooded Lane with Cottage in Distance		oil on board	21.6 x 27.9		Sold at Keys in 2015 for £720.
	Fish Auction, Yarmouth Beach	1827	Oil on canvas	63.5 cm x 76.2	National Trust	
	Fishing Boats in a Harbour	1828	Oil on canvas	64 cm x 92.4	Norwich Museums Collections	
	Greenwich Hospital	1827				"It is at the same time a most charming performance". (Dickes)
	Greenwich Hospital from the River	1827	Oil on canvas	hw		"his masterpiece" (Dodgson) For further information about the painting see the main article about George Vincent.
	Grove Scene, Norwich	1824	oil on panel	55.9 x 47.7	Victoria Art Gallery, Bath, Somerset	
	Landscape		Oil on canvas	22.2 x 32.2	Victoria and Albert Museum	
	Landscape (View near Norwich)		Oil on mahogany panel	26.7 x 34.6	Norwich Museums Collections	
	Landscape, Cattle and Figures				Williamson Art Gallery and Museum	
	Landscape – Cattle Crossing A Stream		Oil on canvas		Birmingham Museum and Art Gallery	
	Landscape – Loading Hay			64.77 x 80		"Texture excellent, particularly on the cattle and sheep." (Dickes)
	Landscape with Cart		Oil on canvas	25.4 x 18.1	Norwich Museums Collections	(attributed)
	Landscape with Cattle in a Pool		oil on wood	25.4 x 30.5	Nottingham Castle Museum and Art Gallery	
	Landscape with Cottages and Tinker	1828	oil on canvas	43.8 x 60.3	Nottingham Castle Museum and Art Gallery	
	Landscape with Figures	1824	oil on wood	38.1 x 48.2	Leeds Art Gallery, Leeds Museums and Galleries	
	Landscape with figures and cottage		Oil on panel	25.4 x 18.1	Norwich Museums Collections	
	Landscape with mule, pedlar and figures				Nottingham Castle Museum and Art Gallery	
	Lane Scene		Oil on oak panel	24.8 x 20.3	Norwich Museums Collections	
	Loch Etive, Argyllshire	1821	Oil on canvas	54 x 72.2	Fitzwilliam Museum, Cambridge	
	London from the Surrey Side of Waterloo Bridge	1820	oil on canvas	142.24 x 203.2		"an important work" (Dickes) Listed and illustrated in A catalogue of pictures by British artists in the possession of Sir John Fleming Leicester, Bart. (1825) Sold at Christie's on 11 September 2019 as St. Paul's from the Surrey Side of Blackfriars Bridge, figures and sailing barges in the foreground, for £10,000.
	Middle Mill, Wandsworth		oil on canvas	65 x 89.5	British Embassy, Luxembourg	Part of the Government Art Collection
	Mousehole Heath, Norfolk		oil on canvas	43 x 63	The Ashmolean Museum of Art and Archaeology	(attributed to)
	Mouth of the Yare	1821	Oil on panel	71.1 x 91.4	Towneley Hall Art Gallery & Museum	
	Norfolk river scene		Oil on panel	47.5 x 55.5		Sold at Bonhams in 2008 (fetched £4200)
	On the river Yare				Sheffield Museums	
	On the River Yare		Oil on canvas	87.0 x 112.7	Norwich Museums Collections	
	On the River Yare, Norfolk		Oil on canvas			
	Overstand near Cromer		oil on panel	21.6 x 16.1		Sold at Keys in 2014 for £300.
	Pastoral Scene	1828	Oil on mahogany panel	66.1 x 84.5	Norwich Museums Collections	
	Pevensey Bay 1824	1824	Oil on paper laid on millboard	20.6 x 27.5	Norwich Museums Collections	Signed, inscribed and dated lower left centre 'GV to HD 1824'.
	Portrait of George Vincent (1796–1832), with landscape background by himself		Oil on canvas	77 cm x 63.5	Norwich Museums Collections	Portrait by James Clover
	Postwick Grove		Oil on panel	38.4 x 32.4	Norwich Museums Collections	
	River Scene with Boats	1825	Oil on board	25 x 35	National Trust, Felbrigg Hall	
	Road Scene with Cattle		Oil on oak panel	42.2 x 34.9	Norwich Museums Collections	
	Road Scene with Cottage		Oil on panel	29.8 x 38.1	Norwich Museums Collections	
	Rouen	1816	Oil on canvas	63.4 cm x 91.7	Norwich Museums Collections	Vincent's only painting derived from a visit to the continent in 1816. Probably painted shortly after a visit to France, may have been inspired by Boulevard des Italiens, painted by John Crome. "...marred by inconsistencies of scale and perspective..." (Hemingway)
	Rural landscape with figures		Oil on canvas	63.5 cm x 81.3		A group of large russet trees are in the foreground before a pool, on which three ducks are floating. At left and right are thatched cottages amid foliage. Exhibited in New York in 1932.
	Rustic Scene	1826	Oil on panel	53.0 x 63.8	Norwich Museums Collections	On display at the Elizabethan House Museum, Great Yarmouth
	Sea Piece	1827	oil on canvas	50.2 x 68.6	Nottingham Castle Museum and Art Gallery	
	Ship Building at Greenwich	1823	Oil on canvas	31 x 40	Sold at Bonhams in 2004 (fetched £27,500)	Stamped to the reverse of the panel: 'R. Davy, 83 Newman Street'. This would date the panel to post-1822. Exhibited: Norwich School paintings, Norwich Castle 1927. No 121.
	St Benet's Abbey, Norfolk		oil on panel	21.6 x 27.9		Sold at Keys in 2016.
	Sunlit glade		Oil on mahogany panel	67.3 x 83.8	Art Gallery NSW (Australia)	
	The Blasted Oak	1830	Oil on canvas	76.1 x 63.1	Norwich Museums Collections	
	The River Yare with Cottage and Young Man Fishing from the Bank		oil on canvas	40.6 x 55.9		Sold at Keys in 2012.
	The Travelling Pedlar	c.1826	Oil on canvas	388.4 x 112	Norfolk Museums Service	
	The Travelling Tinker		oil on canvas	42.2 x 53.3	Victoria Art Gallery, Bath, Somerset	
	The Travelling Tinker				Christchurch Mansion Museum and Art Gallery, Suffolk	
	Trowse Hythe, near Norwich		Oil on canvas	31.8 cm x 41.3	Norwich Museums Collections	
	Trowse Meadows, near Norwich	1828	Oil on canvas	72.9 x 109.4	Norwich Museums Collections	"This charming pastoral was apparently so admired by Thirtle that he made a beautiful water-colour drawing from it". (Dickes) "...one of the most impressive of his late works. It inevitably invites comparison with Constable's Haywain"; "The handling of Trowse Meadows does not have the transparency and glitter of Constable's paintwork, but the perspective of the clouds, the light effect and the atmospheric recession are all superbly rendered." (Hemingway) "The dainty painting of the trees, the broad treatment of the middle distance and above all the spectacular cloud formation... ...are all features associated with the best of Vincent's late work". (Moore)
	Valley of the Yare, near Bramerton	1828	Oil on canvas	76.2 x 104.5	Norwich Museums Collections	
	View from Sandlings Ferry			45.7 x 63.5		"...has a good deal of quiet beauty." (The Builder, 12 January 1878) "This picture is remarkable for its pearly atmosphere. A tender vapour seems to pervade the scene." Owned by the Norfolk antiquarian William Birkbeck in 1905.(Dickes) Donated to the Norwich Castle Museum by his widow in 1914. Sold to Liverpool Museum in 1956.
	View in Glen Sharrah near Inverary	1823	Oil on canvas	63.5 x 76.8	Norwich Museums Collections	
	View in the Highlands	1827	Oil on canvas	101.6 x 127.9	Fitzwilliam Museum, Cambridge	
	View near Norwich, Norfolk	c.1820	Oil on canvas	50 x 60	Northampton Museums & Art Gallery	
	View near Pevensey Bay, Sussex, with Shepherd and Sheep		Oil on canvas	64.77 x 79		Reproduced in Walpole Art and Artists of the Norwich School, p. 46.
	View near Wroxham, Norfolk		oil on canvas	49.1 x 38.8	Manchester Art Gallery	
	View of Yarmouth from Gorleston		Oil on canvas	104.1 x 166.4		"Though a multiplicity of detail gives a rather spotty effect, the sky naturally and solidly painted, representing beautiful floating clouds, renders this a masterpiece." (Dickes)
	View on the River Yare		oil on canvas	112.5 x 202	Southampton City Art Gallery	
	Woodland Road with Horseman and Sheep		Oil on panel	45.7 x 33	National Trust for Scotland, Brodie Castle	
	Yarmouth Quay	1823	Oil on canvas	77.2 x 103.0	Norwich Museums Collections	

== Other works ==
Image	Title	Date	Technique	height x width (cm)	Location	Commentary
	Drawing	1819	Graphite on paper	15.2 x 20.2	British Museum	
	Shipping scene		watercolour on paper	15.9 x 23.4	Norwich Museums Collections	
	The Needles (The Needles from Christchurch)	1830	Watercolour on paper	16.8 x 20.4	Norwich Museums Collections	"a pleasant piece of work to which the underlying jumpiness of the drawing gives vitality" (Clifford)
	Thorpe, near Norwich		watercolour	17.8 x 27.9		sold at Keys in 2015 for £180.

== Attributed works ==
Image	Title	Date	Technique	height x width (cm)	Location	Commentary
	A View Near Norwich, with Cattle Grazing		Oil on panel	(11" x 16.5")	Sold at auction 2019 for £280.	
	A view on the Broads with men fishing from punts	undated	Oil on canvas	64.8 x 87.7	Sold at auction in 2020	
