= Henry Trengrouse =

British inventor

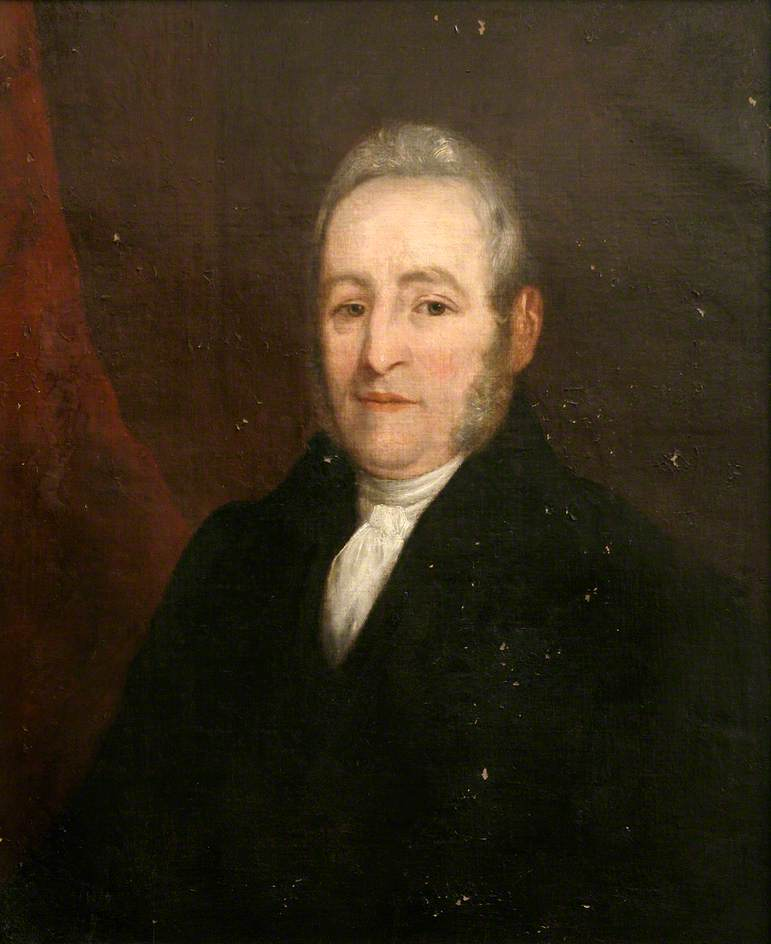
- Henry Trengrouse, portrait by John Opie
- Born: 18 March 1772; Helston, Cornwall, England
- Died: 14 February 1854 (aged 81); Helston, Cornwall, England
- Education: Helston Grammar School
- Occupation: Engineer
- Spouse: Mary (née Jenken)
- Children: Three sons and five daughters
- Parent(s): Nicholas and Mary Trengrouse (née Williams)
- Engineering career
- Discipline: Civil
- Significant design: 'Rocket' life-saving apparatus, an early form of the Breeches buoy

Henry Trengrouse (18 March 1772 – 14 February 1854) was a British inventor who invented the "Rocket" lifesaving apparatus.

On 24 December 1807 he witnessed the wreck of the frigate Anson in Mount's Bay, when over a hundred people died, and this disaster led him to devote his life and patrimony to the discovery of some means for saving lives at shipwrecks. He spent much labour in attempting to devise a lifeboat, but produced no satisfactory results, and turned his attention to the "Rocket" lifesaving apparatus, an early form of the Breeches buoy. In addition to this, Trengrouse was dismayed at the then common practice of burying victims of shipwrecks in common graves in unconsecrated ground near the site of the wreck, having seen the dead from the Anson buried in the dunes at Loe Bar. He persuaded his local MP, Davies Gilbert, to work for a change in the law, and from 1808 the practice was abolished.

== Early life ==
Trengrouse was born in Helston, Cornwall, was the son of Nicholas Trengrouse (1739–1814) by his wife, Mary Williams (d. 1784). The family had long been the principal freeholders in Helston. Henry was educated at Helston grammar school, and resided there all his life. Samuel Drew was his intimate friend.

== Background ==
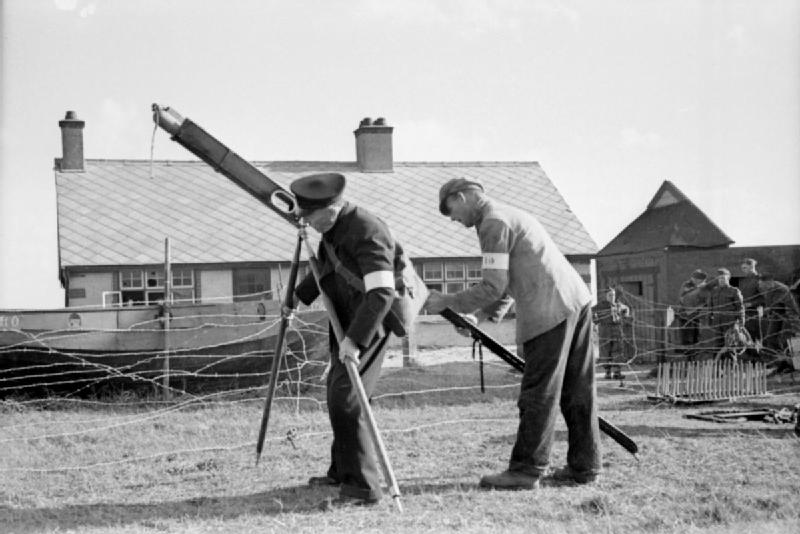

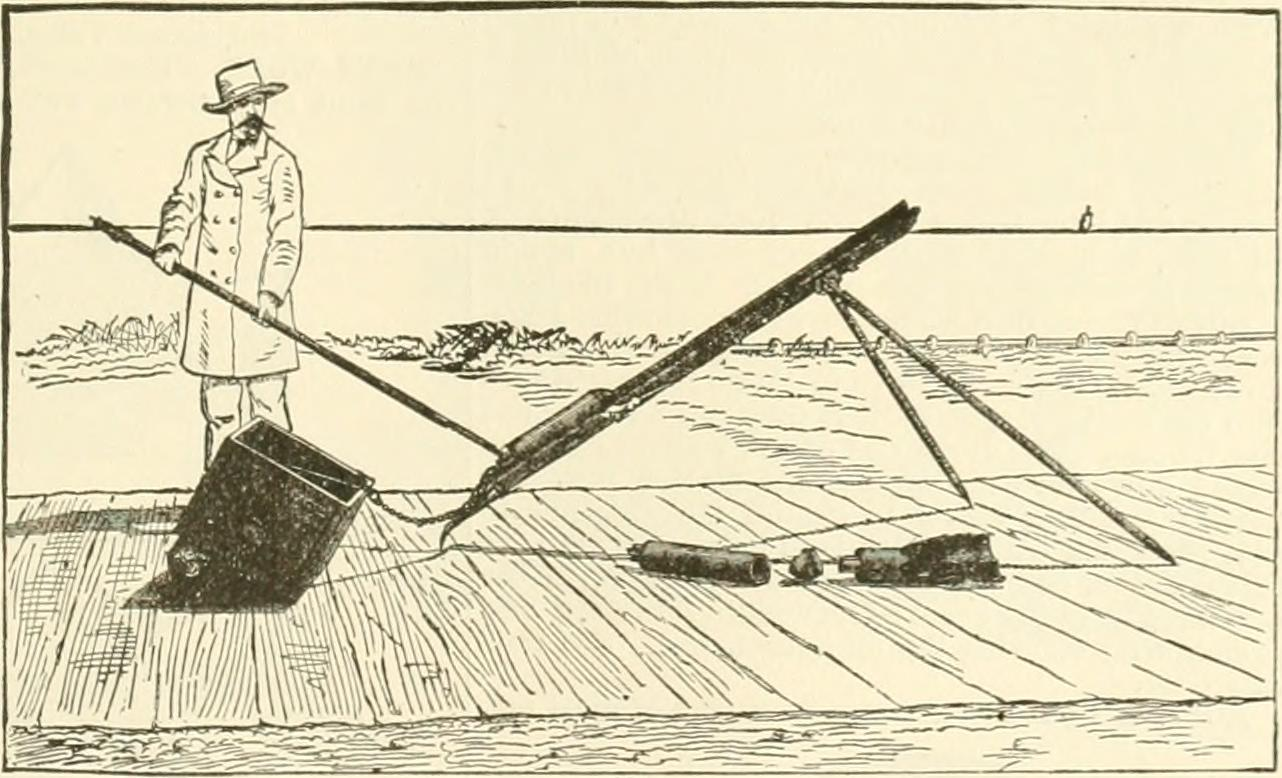

As early as 1791, John Bell had devised an apparatus for throwing a line to ships from the shore; and, concurrently with Trengrouse, Captain George William Manby was engaged in perfecting an apparatus very similar to Bell's. The idea occurred to Manby in February 1807, after the grounding of HMS Snipe a mere 50 yards off shore in a storm and the subsequent loss of 67 lives, and in August he exhibited some experiments to the members of the Suffolk House Humane Society. He sought to establish communication between the shore and the shipwreck by means of a line fastened to a barbed shot which was fired from a mortar on the shore. By means of this line a hawser was drawn out from the shore to the ship, and along it was run a cradle in which the shipwrecked persons were landed. This invention had been recommended by various committees, and adopted to some extent before 1814.

Trengrouse's apparatus, which was designed in 1808, was similar to Manby's in the use of the line and hawser, but instead of a mortar he suggested a rocket, and a chair was used instead of a cradle. The distinctive features of the apparatus consisted of 'a section of a cylinder, which is fitted to the barrel of a musket by a bayonet socket; a rocket with a line attached to its stick is so placed in it that its priming receives fire immediately from the barrel'. The advantages were that the rocket was much lighter and more portable than the mortar; that the cost was much smaller; that there was little risk of the line breaking, because the velocity of a rocket increases gradually, whereas that of a shot fired from a mortar was so great and sudden that the line was frequently broken; the whole of Trengrouse's apparatus could, moreover, be packed in a chest four feet three inches by one foot six inches, and carried by vessels of every size, while Manby contemplated the use of the mortar only on shore, and the safety of the vessel depended therefore on the presence of an apparatus in the vicinity of the wreck.

== Recognition ==
It was not, however, until 28 February 1818, after many journeys to London, that Trengrouse exhibited his apparatus before Admiral Sir Charles Rowley. A committee was appointed, and on 5 March it reported 'that Mr. Trengrouse's mode appears to be the best that has been suggested for the purpose of saving lives from shipwreck by gaining a communication with the shore; and, so far as the experiments went, it most perfectly answered what was proposed;’ it was also suggested that a specimen apparatus should be placed in every dockyard that naval officers might become familiar with its working. In the same year a committee of the Elder Brethren of Trinity House also reported in its favour, and recommended that 'no vessel should be without it.' The government ordered twenty sets, but afterwards preferred to have them constructed by the ordnance department, and paid Trengrouse £50 compensation. In 1821 the Society of Arts awarded him their large silver medal and thirty guineas for the invention. Alexander I of Russia also wrote Trengrouse an autograph letter, presented him with a diamond ring in recognition of the usefulness of his apparatus, and invited him to Russia; but apart from the prize awarded by the Society of Arts and the compensation paid by the government, Trengrouse reaped no pecuniary reward from his invention. In July 1822 the equipment was demonstrated in Hyde Park, firing the rocket across the Serpentine. Madame Hengler, The King's Pyrotechnic and firework artist had designed the firework rocket. An improved rocket was invented by John Dennett in 1826; a later model was devised by Edward Mounier Boxer in 1855. It became, next to the lifeboat, the most important means of saving lives from shipwrecks. Thousands of lives were saved in that way.

== Death and memorials ==
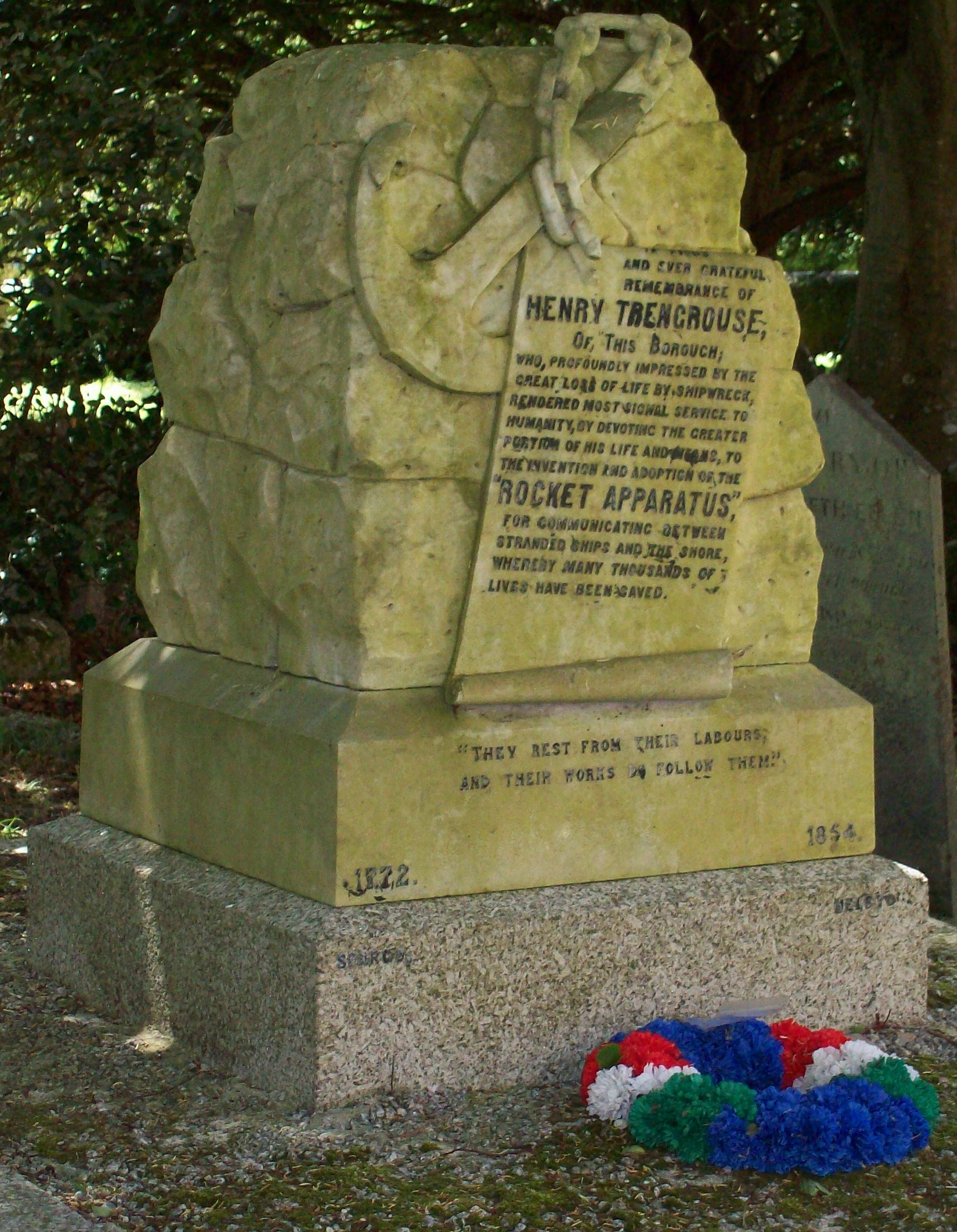
Memorial, St Michael's Church, Helston

Trengrouse died at Helston on 14 February 1854; by his wife Mary, daughter of Samuel Jenken, he left three sons and five daughters. His widow (b. 9 September 1772) died at Helston on 27 March 1863.

An example of his life-saving apparatus is on display at Helston Folk Museum.

He is buried in the churchyard of St Michael's Church, Helston, and is commemorated in the naming of Trengrouse Way, a main thoroughfare in the town.

== See also ==
- Congreve rockets
- George William Manby
- Coastguards of Yesteryear: "Manby Mortar or Rocket Apparatus"

== References and sources ==
=== Other sources ===
- Gentleman's Magazine 1819 i. 559–60, 1822 ii. 71
- Encyclopædia Britannica, 9th ed. xi. 143
- Illustrated London News, 23 Oct. 1854
- George Clement Boase and William Prideaux Courtney's Bibliotheca Cornubiensis
- Boase's Collect. Cornub.

This article incorporates text from a publication now in the public domain: "Henry Trengrouse". Dictionary of National Biography. London: Smith, Elder & Co. 1885–1900.
