= Lyle gun =

Line-throwing gun for rescue

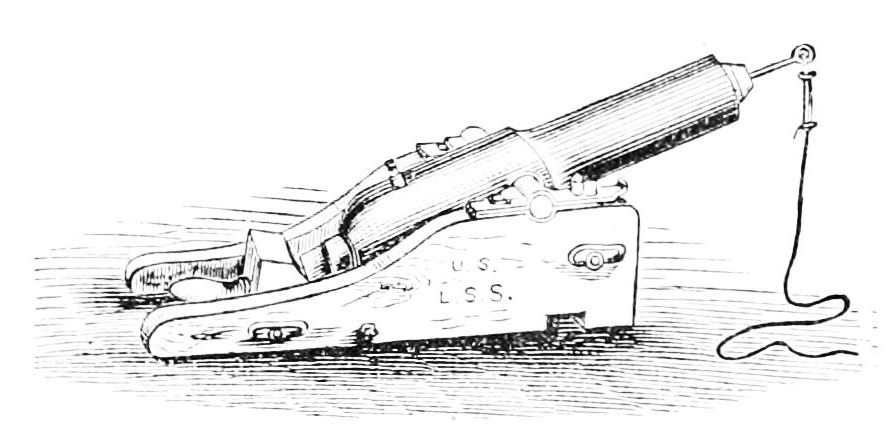
Lyle gun

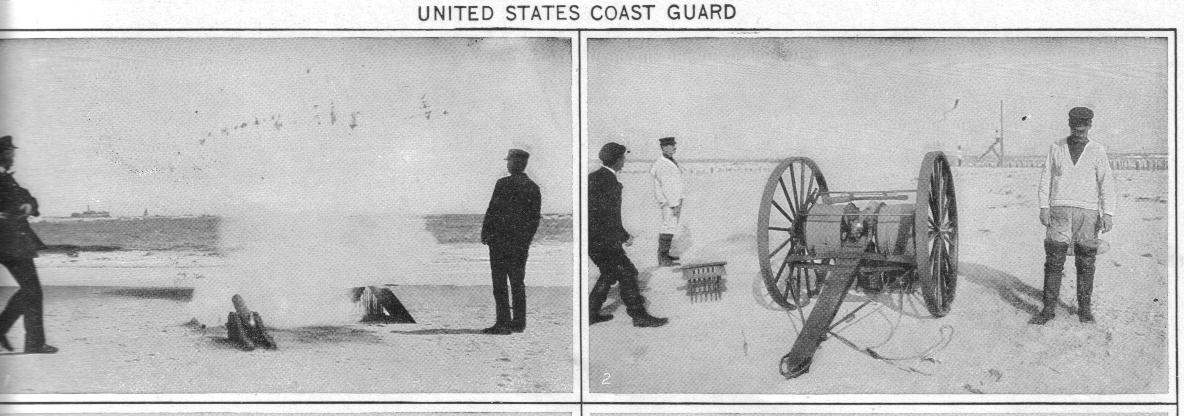
Lyle gun being fired

A Lyle gun was a line thrower powered by a short-barrelled cannon. It was invented by Captain David A. Lyle, US Army, a graduate of West Point and the Massachusetts Institute of Technology, and was used from the late 19th century to 1952, when it was replaced by rockets for throwing lines.

== History ==
Earlier line thrower designs date back to the late 18th century, with the Manby mortar saving lives as early as 1808 when the crew of a brig was rescued at Yarmouth by the use of the device fired from a carriage gun and supervised by captain George Manby. A rocket-based system was also devised by British engineer Henry Trengrouse in 1808.

Sumner Increase Kimball, the first and subsequently only superintendent of the United States Life-Saving Service, wanted to find a better line-throwing device. The Manby mortars previously installed by the Massachusetts Humane Society could throw a line over 300 yards (270 m), but along the New Jersey coast, this often wasn't sufficient to reach wrecked ships. Kimball engaged the help of the United States Army Board of Ordnance and in 1877 they assigned David A. Lyle (1845–1937), a first lieutenant, who began research and testing that resulted in reliable efficient designs. Lyle developed 3 bronze, smooth-bore guns of different sizes and the 2 1/2-inch-bore (64 mm) gun became the USLSS standard line-throwing gun.

Projectiles for the gun were made of cast iron with a wrought iron eye bolt screwed into the base as an attachment point for the shot line. The projectile for the 2 1/2-inch (64 mm) gun was 15 3/4 inches (400 mm) long and weighed 19 pounds (8.6 kg). It was placed into the 24-inch-long (610 mm) gun barrel so the eye bolt with the line attached was sticking out. After firing, the projectile rotated so that the eye bolt and line were trailing. The gun had a large recoil from firing. A standard charge of 1.5 ounces (43 g) of gunpowder would knock the gun back 6 feet (1.8 m). The maximum rescue charge of 8 ounces (230 g) would send the gun flying back much further.

The type of gunpowder used was also critical. It was a variation of black powder, uniform grain size, marketed as Hazard’s Life-Saving Service Powder and DuPont Life-Saving Powder.

Shotline was also just as critical to the accurate operation of the Lyle gun. Hemp line was found to be too brittle. Braided linen was usable, but it was too heavy with sea water after it was fired and had to be dried out before firing again. The best line was waterproofed braided linen. It cut through the air best and provided improved range. New lines were too stiff and were difficult to properly flake (to wind in a pattern so the line could be shot without getting tangled), so a new line needed to be fired several times to make it more flexible for flaking. One of the critical drills of the USLSS crew was flaking the line. If the first shot failed to go over the stranded ship, the line would have to be hauled in, reflaked, and shot again. An efficient flaking crew could minimize the time required to get ready for the second shot. On average, a crewman with two assistants could flake 700 yards (640 m) of line in about 25 minutes.

== Operation ==
These line guns are used primarily for shore based rescue operations. The Lyle Gun was hauled to the shoreline usually by U.S.L.L.S. surfmen in specially made beach carts. The iron wheels that supported the cart had wide bands outside the wheel to keep it from sinking into soft sand.

The Surfmen would set up and fire the Lyle gun, aiming over the stranded or wrecked vessel and then pull the line within reach of the victims. The line fired to the ship in distress was a messenger line that was in turn tied to a heavier line, the Tally Board (with instruction in English and French), and a Tail block designed to support the breeches buoy. Once the breeches buoy lines and the Crotch Pole (an A frame) assembled, the survivors could be removed from the vessel by hand hauling the breeches buoy lines.

The Lyle Gun could shoot the projectile about 700 yards (640 m), although in actual rescues the practical range was much less. Rescues at greater distances were to be accomplished by lifeboats.

== Manufacturers ==
There were about 30 companies who made line-throwing guns from the late 19th century to 1952. Famous names included American Manufacturing, Galbraith, General Ordnance, Naval Company, Sculler and Steward. Production of Lyle Guns ceased in 1952 in favor of line-throwing rockets or pneumatic launchers.

== Beach apparatus gear ==
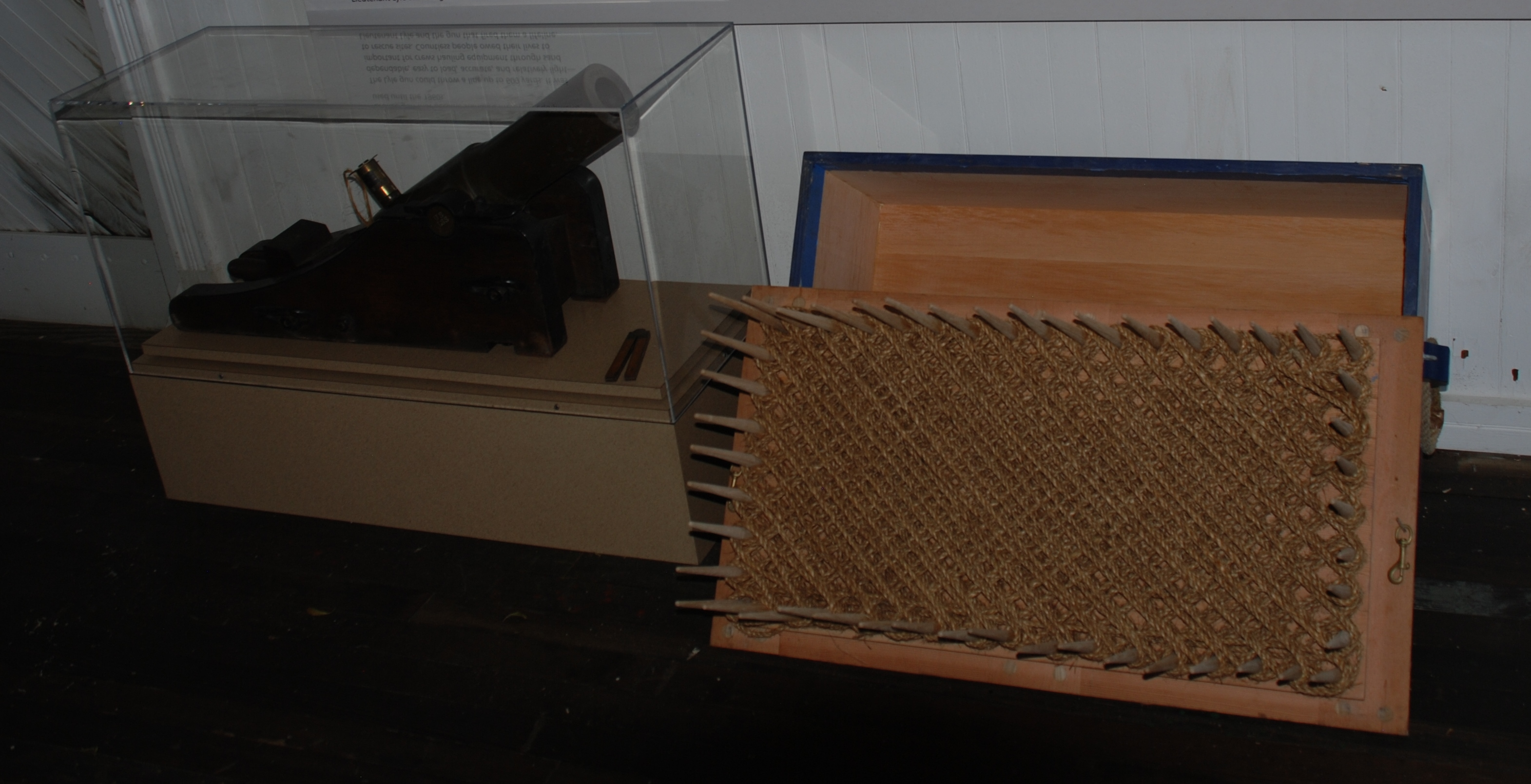
Lyle gun, Shot line and faking box

The Lyle gun was just one component of the items carried on the beach cart; many other pieces of equipment were crucial to the proper execution of the beach-based rescue. The breeches buoy drill, as it was sometimes called, was practiced by the Keeper and all surfmen every Thursday at 2 pm as per the manual at all stations. Crews that couldn't perform the entire drill in five minutes, from rigging the gear to firing the Lyle gun, faced dismissal from the service. It was the crew's responsibility to maintain each piece of equipment in ship-shape as the safety of the crew and the success of the rescues depended upon it. Other items on the beach apparatus equipment list included:

- Shot line and faking box: The shot line is tied to the projectile and is the first line to reach the shipwreck. This is the thinnest line used in the drill and is stored in a special pattern the faking box. This special pattern allows it to pay out freely as the gun is fired. After the drill, the shot line is returned to the box by carefully laying it in the faking pattern, ensuring that it is ready for the next use.
- Heaving stick: The heaving stick was used in case the Lyle gun could not be deployed and substituted as a line throwing device. This was a most dangerous technique, as the surfmen would often have to wade deep into the surf in attempt to get a line aboard the ship.
- Tally board: The tally board is used to deliver instructions to the vessel in peril. It is simply a board with printed instructions (English on one side and French on the other) telling the mariners how to aid the surfmen in their rescue efforts. The tally board is tied to the shot line by the keeper at the same time as the whip line and hauled aboard.

"Make the tail of this block fast to the lower mast well up. If the masts are gone then to the best place you can find. Cast off shot line. See that the rope in the block runs free & show signal to shore."

— Tally board caption
- Whip line and block: The whip consists of two whip reels mounted on the beach cart, the whip line, and the whip block. Once the shot is fired across the wreck or wreck pole, the shore-side end of the shot line is tied to the tail block. At that point it is hoped that there is an able bodied seaman aboard the ship capable of hauling in the shot line and attaching the tail block high aboard the ship. Once it is determined that the line has been secured to the vessel, the whip will be used to haul items such as the hawser, breeches buoy and sometimes the life-cart back and forth between the beach and the wreck. This operates in the same manner as an old-fashioned clothes line with pulleys operates with the surfmen pulling on either the windward or leeward half of the whip from shore.
- Hawser and traveling block: The hawser is the work horse of all the lines. It is a thick, strong rope made from manila with a traveling block attached. This block travels along the hawser and carries the breeches buoy back and forth from the vessel by means of the whip.
- Breeches buoy: The breeches buoy essentially is a life ring sewn into a pair of short pants. It is used to transport the wreck victim from the ship to the beach. It is attached to the traveling block which rides along the hawser and pulled back and forth by the surfmen manning the whip line.
- Fall: The fall is a block and tackle pulling device used to place tension on the hawser. The fall consists of an inner block and outer block and has a ratio of 4:1, giving five surfmen the pulling strength of twenty. The outer* block is painted blue to indicate that it faces seaward and the outer* block is painted white to indicate that this block faces shoreward and is attached to the sand anchor pendant. *One of these is Wrong, recheck ...
- Strap: The strap is a rope tied to itself to form a loop and is used to attach the fall's outer block hooks to the hawser by means of a knot named a cat's paw .
- Crotch pole: The crotch pole is used to keep the victims and equipment traveling along the hawser above the crashing surf. It consists of two boards approximately 8 feet (2.4 m) long fashioned together similar to a pair of scissors. Once tension is placed on the hawser by means of the surfman pulling on the fall the Keeper will give the command to raise the crotch pole in position. Now the hawser is high above the surf and is ready to transport equipment.
- Sand anchor: The sand anchor is used to secure the shore-side of the fall to the beach. It consists of two wooden planks connected loosely together with an eye bolt with pendant attached. The pendant is used to attach the fall to the sand anchor. A narrow trench is dug in the fashion of a cross to a depth of approximately 2 1/2 feet (0.76 m). The anchor is placed in it and buried with care given not to cover the pendant.
- Pick, shovel, and bucket: The pick and shovel are used to dig the trench to place the sand anchor. The bucket is used to carry water to wet a section of the shot line and to flood the Lyle gun barrel in the event of a misfire.
- Hawser cutter: The hawser cutter is used to cut the hawser near the ship after the last victim is rescued. The cutter rides along the hawser and is pulled back and forth by the surfmen pulling on the whip line. The blades are carefully angled so that the hawser cutter moves freely along the hawser when being pulled seaward, but slices the hawser in two when pulled toward the shore.
- Beach cart: The beach cart is a most essential part of the beach apparatus. Without the cart, it would be impossible for the surfmen to transport the equipment to the site of the wreck. The cart is pulled by two surfmen, pushed by two and steered by two. The beach cart rides on two wide metal wheels to keep it from sinking into the sand and fully loaded can weigh nearly 2,000 pounds (910 kg). It also is crucial that the cart is loaded in a specific order where the first item loaded is the last item unloaded.
