= Battle of Delhi (1803) =

1803 battle of the Second Anglo-Maratha War

- Part of the Second Anglo-Maratha War
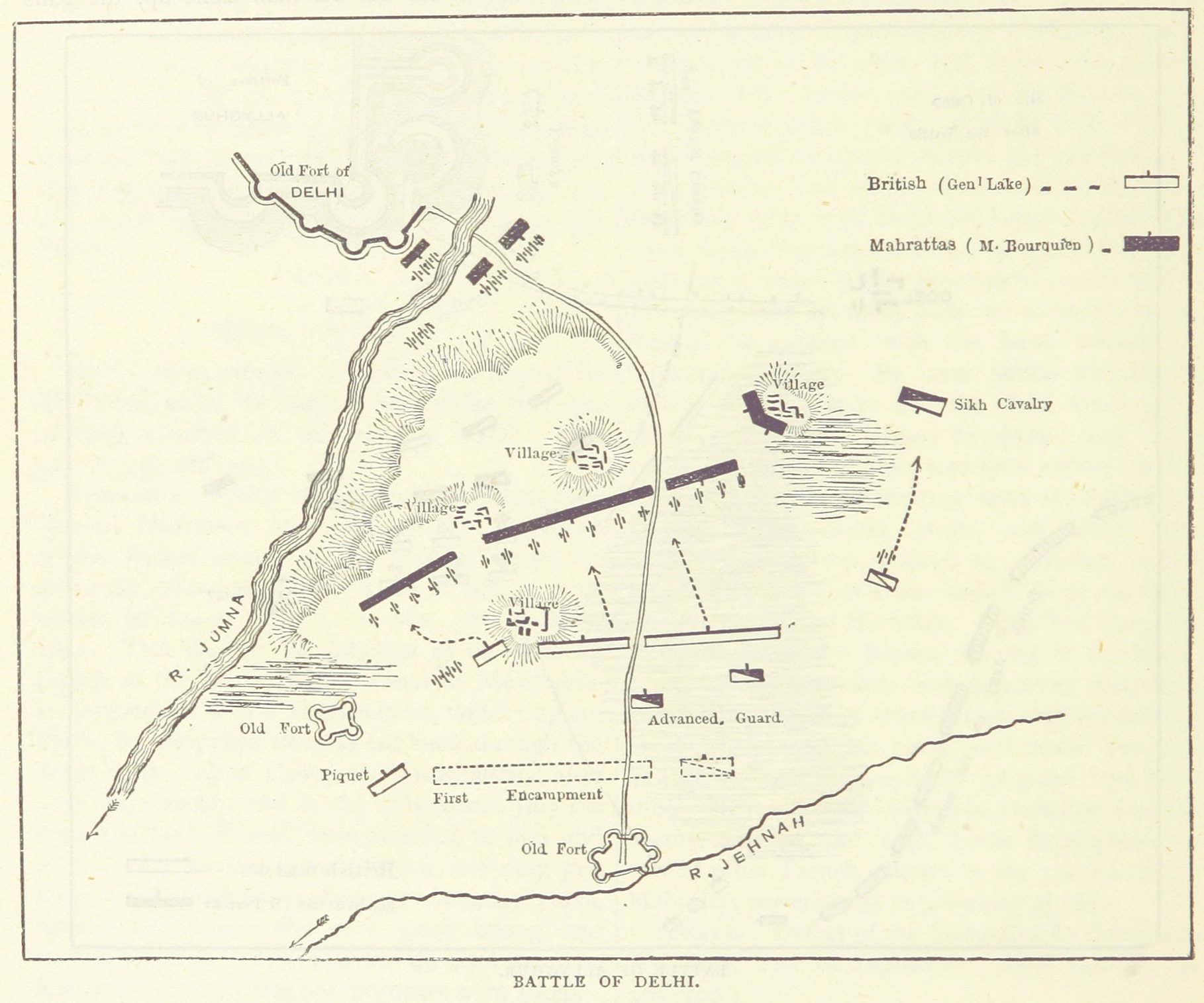
- 1873 map of the battle
Date	11 September 1803
Location	Near Delhi, Mughal Empire 28°36′45″N 77°17′30″E
Result	British victory

Belligerents
United Kingdom; East India Company	Maratha Empire

Commanders and leaders
Gerard Lake	Daulat Rao Scindia

Strength
4,500 troops; 9 guns	19,000 troops; 100 guns

Casualties and losses
~464–485 killed or wounded	~3,000 killed or wounded
- Location within Delhi Delhi (India)

The Battle of Delhi (also known as the Battle of Patparganj) was fought on 11 September 1803 near Delhi during the Second Anglo-Maratha War. It was fought between a British force of 4,500 troops under General Gerard Lake and a Maratha army of 19,000 men commanded by Daulat Rao Scindia. The British were victorious, defeating Scindia's army and inflicting around 3,000 casualties while suffering less than 500.

== Background ==
Expecting forthcoming conflict with the Marathas, two Company armies began drilling for war. While Major-general Arthur Wellesley prepared his forces in the newly conquered Seringapatnam, General Lake drilled his men in the north, close to the Maratha border.

When war broke out on 1 August Governor-General of India Richard Wellesley ordered two main thrusts into Maratha territory; one by Lake to take Delhi, and one by Arthur Wellesley to secure the Deccan region, accompanied by minor offensives on the coasts of Gujarat and Orissa.

Lake left Kanpur on 7 August with an army of 10,000 men, accompanied by a cavalry division with Galloper guns. Lake's army proceeded to advance on the Maratha fortress of Aligarh on 29 August, with General Perron fleeing to Delhi to gather reinforcements, and eventually surrendering to Lake on 1 September.

== Battle ==
With Perron's surrender, Lt. Col. Louis Bourquin took control at Delhi. Upon receiving news that Lake planned on advancing on Delhi as soon as possible, Bourquin crossed the Yamuna with 19,000 troops, and prepared an ambush on the Hindon river. Bourquin chose a low hill overlooking a road flanked by two swampy lakes in order to funnel any enemy force into a bottleneck. He hid 100 heavy guns behind the elephant grass at the base of the hill, and awaited the enemy.

On 11 September, Lake ordered his men to camp for breakfast on the banks of the Hindon, after rapidly marching 18 miles to Delhi. Very soon after the army had camped, Bourquin ordered the heavy artillery at the base of the hill to open fire. While the British army retreated in confusion, the Marathas failed to take advantage of the opportunity, and held position, giving Lake time to organize his men.

To lure Borquin away from his position, Lake ordered a feint, making the infantry fall back while executing a pincer movement with his cavalry, hidden in the grass. When the Marathas took the bait and abandoned their defensive positions, the Company infantry turned and charged with bayonets, supported by the galloper guns. Quartermaster John Pester, who was severely wounded by the initial Maratha bombardment, wrote:

"We drove them into the Yamuna, and hundreds of them were destroyed in endeavouring to cross it."

On the night of the 11th five French mercenary officers in Maratha service surrendered to Lake, ending the battle.

== Aftermath ==
The battle was the final time Britons and Frenchmen fought in South Asia. Following Arthur Wellesley's victory at the Battle of Assaye on 23 September Maratha power in India began to gradually decline until they were finally defeated by the British in the Third Anglo-Maratha War. Following his victory Lake moved to capture Agra Fort, leaving David Ochterlony in charge of Dehli. Octerlony quickly set up an administration consisting of Company civil servants and old Mughal court officials to manage the city and reduced the Mughal Emperor Shah Alam II to a mere figurehead. A monument was erected at the site of the battle in Patparganj, marked out by a surrounding ditch, commemorating the British troops who fell in the battle.
