= Galloper =

Galloper could refer to:

- Hyundai Galloper, an SUV manufactured between 1991 and 2003
- Another name for carousel
- Galloper gun, an artillery used circa 1740 in British colonies
- An obsolete term for aide-de-camp

== See also ==
- Galloper Santamo, a licensed Mitsubishi Chariot minivan
