= Thomas Manby =

Royal Navy officer

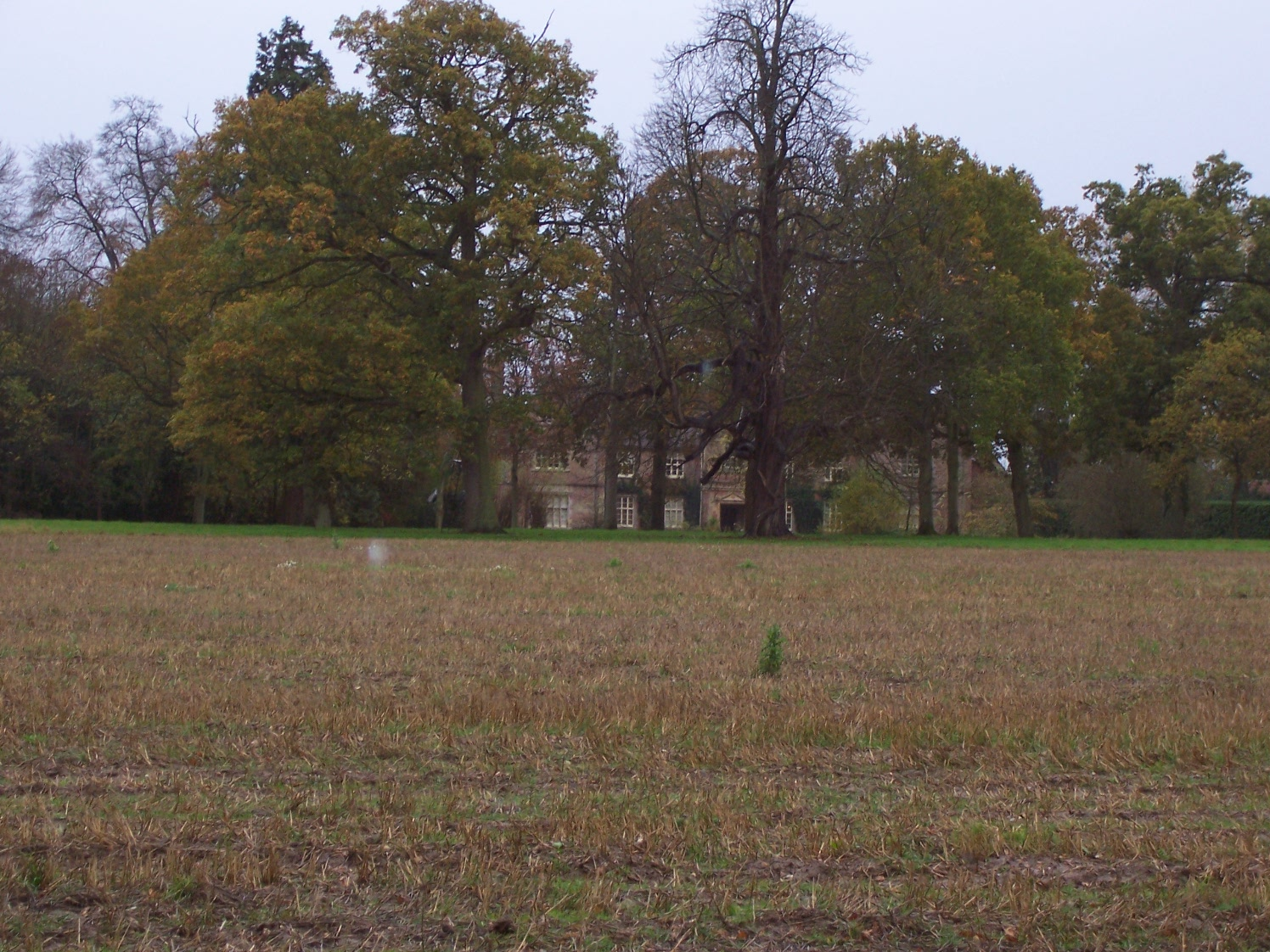
Wood Hall Manor, Hilgay: Manby's birthplace

Rear-Admiral Thomas Moore Manby (1 January 1769 – 13 June 1834) was a Royal Navy officer who served in the French Revolutionary and Napoleonic Wars. He sailed with George Vancouver on his voyages of exploration, captained HMS Bordelais, HMS Africaine and HMS Thalia, and was the chief suspect in the "delicate investigation" into the morals of Caroline of Brunswick.

== Early life ==
Manby was born in the village of Hilgay on the edge of the Norfolk Fens. His father, Matthew Pepper Manby, was lord of the manor of Wood Hall in Hilgay and a former soldier and aide-de-camp to Lord Townshend. Manby's eldest sister Mary Jane (1763-1773), younger brother John (1773-1783) and two other siblings died as children. His eldest brother was George William Manby (1765-1854), the inventor of life-saving devices including the Manby Mortar. Townshend arranged a position for the young Manby in the stationers of the ordnance department, but Manby dreamt of a life at sea and at the age of 14 resigned his post and embarked as a midshipman on board the 24-gun Hyaena. After two years on the Irish station he joined Cygnet and sailed to the Caribbean, returning on Amphion, and then served on the 74-gun Illustrious.

== Voyage with Vancouver ==
In 1790, when he was 21, Manby was appointed as the master's mate on George Vancouver's ship Discovery. The British Admiralty had ordered Vancouver to complete a survey of the Pacific Northwest and take possession of disputed land at Nootka Sound on the island that is now named after him. Discovery was fitted out for exploration, complete with a plant frame on the quarterdeck to bring back specimens. Together with the brig Chatham, Discovery left Plymouth 1 April 1791. The two ships called at New Zealand, Tahiti and Hawaii before reaching the starting point for the American survey, the Strait of Juan de Fuca, almost exactly a year after setting out. Manby recorded his first impressions of the coast:

It had more the aspect of enchantment than reality, with silent admiration each discerned the beauties of Nature, and nought was heard on board but expressions of delight murmured from every tongue. Imperceptibly our Bark skimmed over the glassy surface of the deep, about three Miles an hour, a gentle breeze swelled the lofty Canvass whilst all was calm below.

Discovery and Chatham spent the next three summers surveying the north-west coast of America, passing the winters in Hawaii. They arrived at Nootka Sound in the autumn of 1792 and, when disputes arose with the Spanish, several officers were sent back to England to request instructions from the Admiralty. Manby was promoted to fill vacant places: firstly as master of Chatham and then as a lieutenant on Discovery. The relationship between Manby and Vancouver was not however a harmonious one. Manby wrote that Vancouver had "grown Haughty Proud Mean and Insolent, which has kept himself and his Officers in a continual state of wrangling".

== French Revolutionary Wars ==
The expedition returned in 1795, by which time Britain was at war with France. Manby spent the next year as a lieutenant in the 84-gun HMS Juste and then in early 1797 was appointed as commander of the troop ship HMS Charon, protecting merchantmen in the Irish Sea and English Channel. During the two years he commanded Charon, Manby provided protection to 4,753 vessels, not one of which was lost, and he also captured the French privateer Alexandrine.

Manby was promoted to captain on 22 January 1799, three weeks after his thirtieth birthday. Later that year he was appointed commander of the 24-gun HMS Bordelais, a former French privateer nicknamed "the Coffin" on account of her dangerous build. Manby had rescued his brother George from debtors' prison, and he now took him on board his ship as a lay chaplain. On a trip to Ireland Bordelais foundered on a sandbank; Manby managed to refloat her by throwing everything possible overboard and they limped back to Plymouth. The incident brought home to George the dangers of a lee shore in a storm and led to his invention of the Manby Mortar, a life-line for sailors wrecked close to shore. Back in Plymouth, George underwent an operation to remove slugs and rotting hat from his skull (he had been shot by his wife's lover some years previously). Afterwards he appeared to be dying and decided that he "preferred to die at sea among sailors (a consoling and compassionate class of man) rather than be left in the care of a mistress of lodgings, to be hurried to my grave unnoticed and unknown". As such Thomas took his elder brother back on board before setting off for duty around the Azores. During the trip Bordelais captured a valuable coffee-laden French merchantman and George recovered his health.

Following a short period spent blockading Vlissingen, Bordelais was sent to the Caribbean, where she sank the French warship Curieuse on 29 January 1801. After the Treaty of Amiens brought a halt to hostilities between Britain and France, Manby was appointed to the Juno and returned to England, where the ship was paid off. A notice dated August 14, 1802 in The London Gazette stated that head money would be paid to the crew of Bourdelais for sinking Curieuse.

== Napoleonic Wars ==
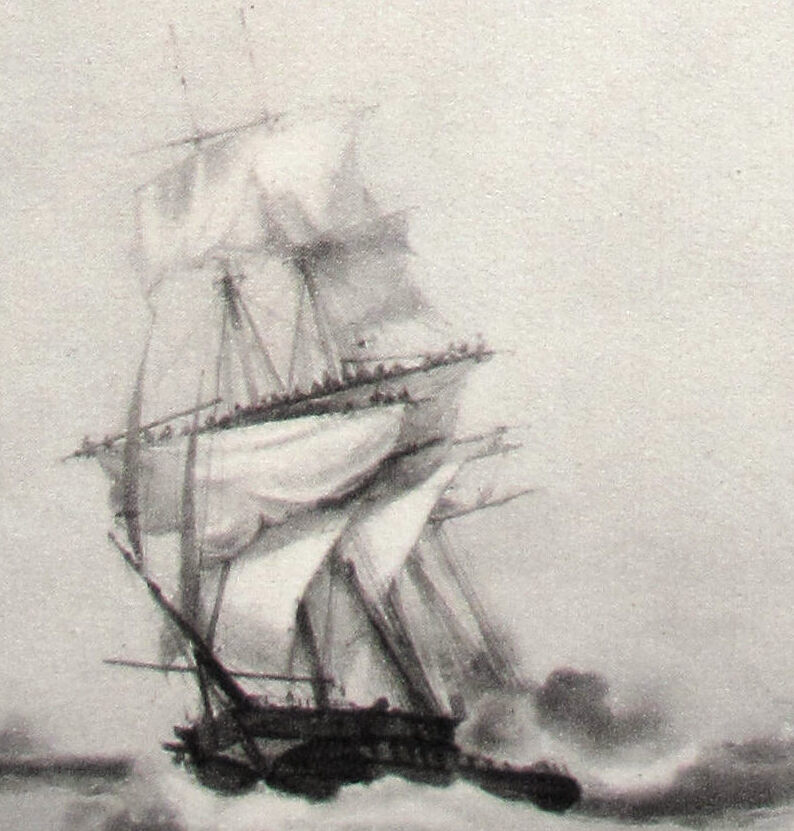
Painting of HMS Africaine

Manby was not out of commission for long. In October 1802 the Earl of St Vincent, first Lord of the Admiralty, sent for him and said 'I don't like to see an active officer idle on shore; I therefore give you the Africaine, one of the finest frigates in the British navy'. On leaving the Juno, Manby had visited his friend and patron, Lord Townshend, at Raynham Hall in Norfolk, and Lady Townshend had introduced him to Caroline of Brunswick. While Africaine was being fitted out at Deptford Dockyard, Manby was a frequent visitor to Montagu House in Blackheath where Caroline, who was estranged from her husband the Prince of Wales, lived. Manby soon replaced Sir Sidney Smith in Caroline's affections. She bought the soft furnishings for his cabin and asked the Admiralty to send Africaine to attend her in the Downs when she rented a house at Ramsgate in the summer. War with France had resumed in May 1803 and Africaine was called away from her royal duties to blockade the port of Hellevoetsluis, although Manby was able to visit Caroline again the following summer when she took a house in Southend and the Africaine anchored off the Nore for a few weeks.

After two years blockading Hellevoetsluis, Africaine joined Admiral Thomas Macnamara Russell's squadron off the Texel and was badly damaged in a storm. Having had his ship refitted at Sheerness, Manby was ordered to escort a fleet of merchant ships to the Caribbean. On the return journey there was an outbreak of yellow fever on board. Three days out from Carlisle Bay, Barbados the ship's surgeon and assistant were dead, and Manby had to take care of the sick. Acting on the instructions of a doctor who came alongside in a small boat from Saint Kitts, he treated them with calomel. By the time Africaine reached England she had lost nearly one-third of her crew and officers, and had to spend forty days in quarantine off the Isles of Scilly. Manby had survived an attack of the fever with large doses of calomel, but his health never recovered. He had also received several serious wounds in action, and had suffered from rheumatic pains since his voyages with Vancouver.

Africaine was decommissioned and Manby was appointed to the frigate HMS Thalia. He spent a year in command of a squadron off the Channel Islands and captured a French privateer, before being sent in 1808 to search for two French frigates off Greenland. The frigates were not found, but Manby surveyed and named Port Manvers on the coast of Labrador before returning to England. It was to be his last voyage. He accepted medical advice to give up his ship and bought an estate in Northwold in Norfolk.

== The "delicate investigation" ==
In 1806 King George III, at the request of the Prince of Wales, ordered an inquiry - a "delicate investigation" - into rumours that Caroline had given birth to a child. A number of men were suspected of having had a relationship with Caroline (which was grounds for a charge of high treason), but it was Manby against whom the evidence was "particularly strong". Manby was called before the commissioners of the inquiry and swore on oath that he never did "at Montagu House, Southend, Ramsgate, East Cliff, or anywhere else, ever sleep in any house occupied by, or belonging to, HRH the Princess of Wales". The commissioners concluded that the main accusation against Caroline was unfounded, but nevertheless they criticised her behaviour. Caroline was defended by former attorney general and future prime minister Spencer Perceval, who dismissed the evidence of Caroline's servants as 'hearsay representations'. The gifts and letters from Caroline to Manby were evidence only of her gratitude for Manby having taken two of her charity boys on board Africaine, and his frequent visits were to keep Caroline informed of their progress. If jugs of water and towels were left in the passage when Manby visited it was proof, Perceval argued, of the servants' slovenliness and not of high treason. Perceval was ready to publish his defence in the form of a book when there was a sudden change of government, Caroline was accepted at court, and the book was suppressed. After Perceval's assassination in 1812 the book was published and extracts, including Manby's testimony, were published in The Times.

== Retirement ==
Having given up his naval career on medical advice, Manby settled on an estate in Norfolk and in 1810 married twenty-year-old Judith Hammond. The marriage produced two daughters: Mary Harcourt Manby (1810-1850) and Georgina Manvers Manby (1815-1900). A natural daughter, Elizabeth Annabella Montgomery Manby, had been born in 1807. Mary married, firstly, James Dawes, Baron de Flassans, nephew of Sophie Dawes, Baronne de Feuchères; and secondly, Sir Cavendish Stuart Rumbold, 4th Baronet, brother of diplomat Arthur Carlos Henry Rumbold. Georgina married the French diplomat and politician, Théodore Adolphe Barrot.

Manby moved to London, keeping a house in Christchurch, Dorset. He worked on a chart of the South Pacific which he hoped would prove that the peoples of the region had a common origin, and helped solve the mystery of the disappearance of La Pérouse's ships when he identified medals found by an English whaler in the South Pacific as having belonged to the explorer. He was promoted, by seniority, to rear admiral in 1825.

An inquest at the George Hotel, Southampton on 14 June 1834 was held by G. B. Corfe, Esq. The jury were told it appeared that the deceased had been a long time in a dejected way, and that he had purchased a large quantity of opium, and from the quantity left it is supposed the unfortunate gentleman must have taken 134 grains. The jury deliberated some time and returned a verdict of "Died of taking incautiously an over-dose of opium." The body was taken from the George Hotel, and was interred in South Stoneham.
