= Manby mortar =

19th-century sea rescue device

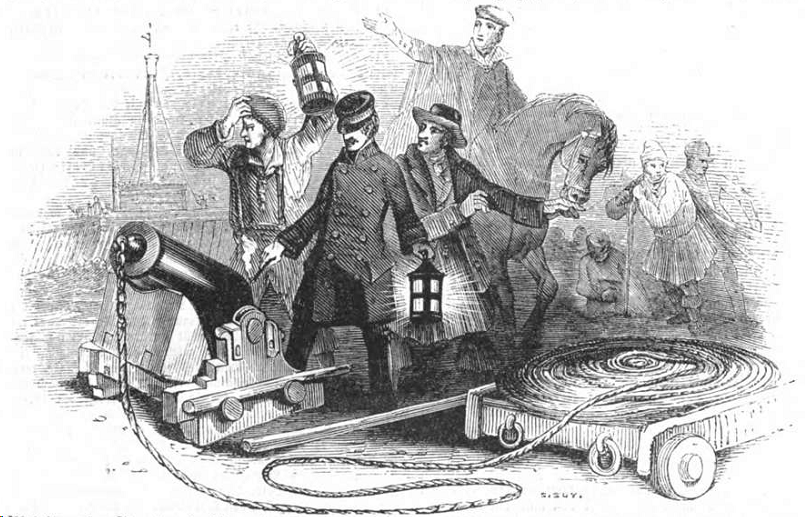
Manby mortar, 1842 drawing

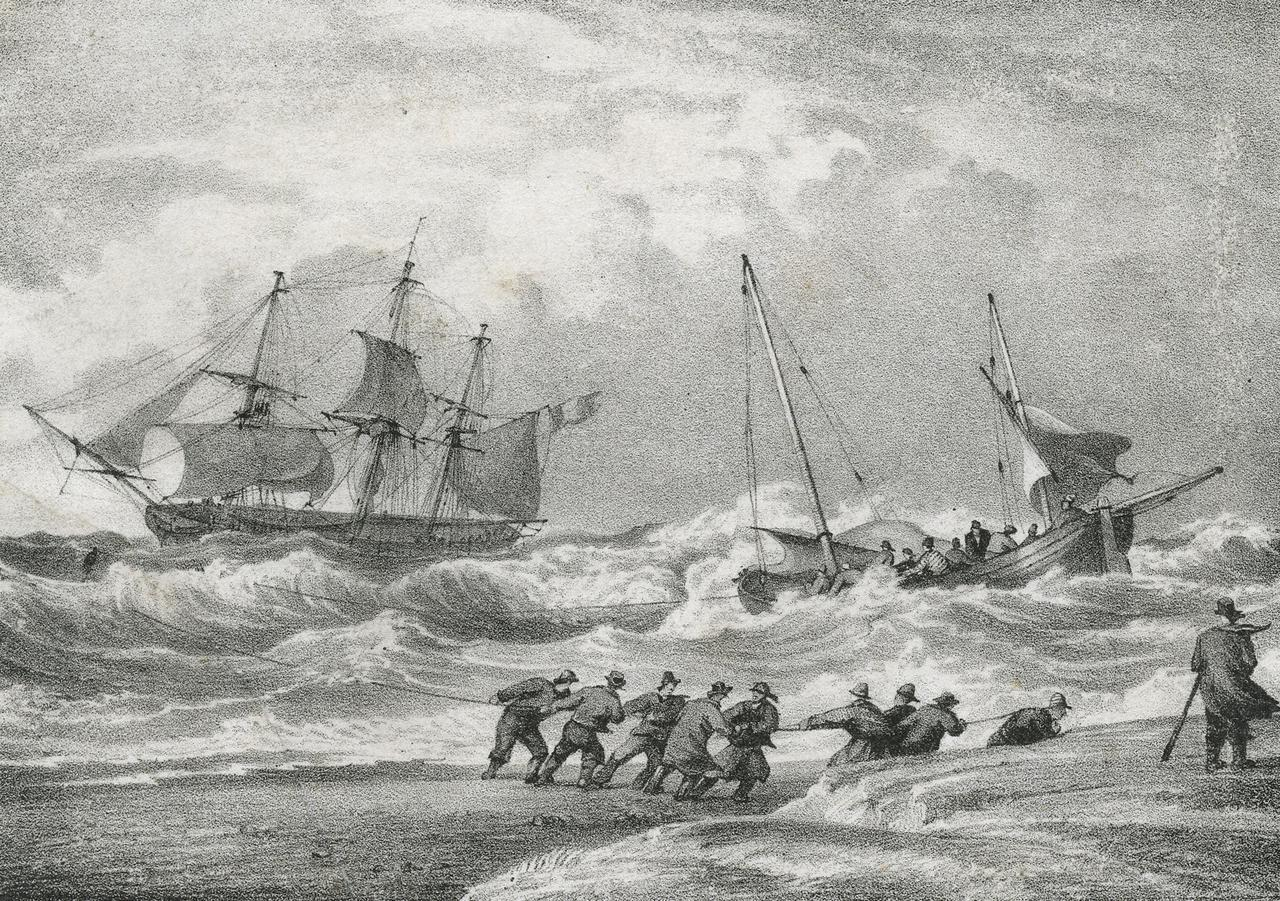
John Cantiloe Joy, Going to a Vessel requiring assistance and Thereby preventing Shipwreck (undated), Norfolk Museums Collections

The Manby mortar or Manby apparatus was a maritime lifesaving device originating at the start of the 19th century, comprising a mortar capable of throwing a line to a foundering ship within reach of shore, such that heavier hawsers could then be pulled into place and used either to direct a rescue-boat to the ship, or, later, to mount a Breeches buoy.

The apparatus was invented by Captain George William Manby, inspired by his witnessing a ship HMS Snipe run aground off Great Yarmouth in 1807.

The first recorded rescue using the Manby apparatus was on 18 February 1808, with Manby himself in charge. The crew of seven were brought to safety from the Plymouth Brig Elizabeth, stranded off the shore at Great Yarmouth. It was estimated that by the time of Manby's death nearly 1000 persons had been rescued from stranded ships by means of his apparatus.

It was used by the Sea Fencibles by 1809, Waterguard, and later by HM Coastguard for many years.

The Hilgay village sign features a Manby Mortar.

== Earlier attempts ==
There had been earlier unsuccessful attempts at similar ideas, including by the French agronomist and inventor Jacques Joseph Ducarne de Blangy, and a ship to shore idea by Sergeant John Bell, in 1792 the Society for the Encouragement of Arts, Manufactures and Commerce gave him a bounty of fifty guineas, he was at that time a sergeant, afterwards a lieutenant in the Royal Artillery. In 1807 the same society furnished some further particulars, with a plate of the apparatus.

The Manby apparatus was also prefigured by proposals, unfulfilled, made by George Miller as early as 1793 to the Society for the Encouragement of Arts, Manufactures and Commerce for the purchase of a mortar and line to rescue people from vessels wrecked on the Dunbar shoreline. Miller was instrumental in the purchase of a lifeboat for Dunbar, amongst the earliest (though not the first) in Britain.

== Development ==
Lifeboat and Manby Apparatus Going Off to a Stranded Vessel by J.M.W. Turner

Early problems were with the chain snapping or line being burnt through by the ignition of the charge. Later Manby credits Captain Harris RN of the Colonial Ropery at Great Grimsby (opened in 1835) with supplying rope more suitable for this use, due to its lightness, pliancy, strength and durability, at the Lincolnshire Shipwreck Association trials of the mortar and Mr Dennet's rocket apparatus held at Cleethorpes in 1838.

The success of rescues depended upon both the team operating the mortar and the crew of the vessel in distress. Unfortunately even as late as 1844 a letter published in the Shipping and Mercantile Gazette described the loss of life of the York Union at Winterton and the Sarah of Goole driven ashore at Corton, due, it is thought, to their crews not knowing their role in operating the equipment.

In the United States the limited range of the Manby mortar was overcome in the second half of the 19th century by the development of the Lyle gun.

As early as 1842 the crew of Huzza from the port of Wisbech were rescued off Hartlepool by the use of a rocket. Eventually the Manby mortar was replaced by rockets. In 1967 a documentary on the inventor was made. Locations included Denver, Downham Market and Great Yarmouth. Scenes include the use of the mortar, rocket and breeches buoy. The recording is now available on the East Anglian Film Archive website.

== See also ==
- Breeches buoy
- John Dennett
