= HMS Snipe (1801) =

Brig of the Royal Navy

HMS Snipe was a gun-brig and the first Royal Navy ship to bear the name Snipe. Her grounding in 1807 inspired the invention of the Manby Mortar, an important development in maritime lifesaving equipment.

== History ==
HMS Snipe was a gun-brig of the Bloodhound class, designed by Sir John Henslow. Snipe and nine other similar vessels were ordered on 7 January 1801, the draught was approved three days later, and all were being built by the end of the month. She was built by Balthazar and Edward Adams of Bucklers Hard and was launched on 2 May 1801.. On 10 January 1803, she was driven ashore on the east Kent coast, but was quickly refloated.

== 1807 grounding ==
On the 18th of February 1807, HMS Snipe ran aground during a storm 50 yards (46 m) off shore at Gorleston, south of Great Yarmouth, with a total of 67 people drowned, including French prisoners of war, women and children. The wreck was witnessed by captain George William Manby. Following this tragedy, Manby experimented with mortars, and so invented the Manby Mortar, (later used with the breeches buoy), that fired a thin rope from shore into the rigging of a ship in distress. A strong rope, attached to the thin one, could be pulled aboard the ship.

== Anholt ==
On 18 May 1809 the 64-gun third rate HMS Standard, under Captain Askew Paffard Hollis, the 36-gun frigate Owen Glendower, Avenger, Ranger, Rose, and Snipe captured the Danish island of Anholt. A party of seamen and marines under the command of Captain William Selby of Owen Glendower, with the assistance of Captain Edward Nicolls of the Standard's marines, landed. The Danish garrison of 170 men put up a sharp but ineffectual resistance that killed one marine and wounded two; the garrison then capitulated. The British took immediate possession of the island. Hollis stated that Anholt was important as a source of water to the Navy, and as a good anchorage for merchant vessels going to or coming from the Baltic.

== Later career ==
Snipe became a mooring lighter in 1815. She was broken up in May 1846. A second Royal Navy ship bearing the name HMS Snipe was launched in 1828.

== See also ==
- List of gun-brigs of the Royal Navy
