= John Philip Davis =

English painter

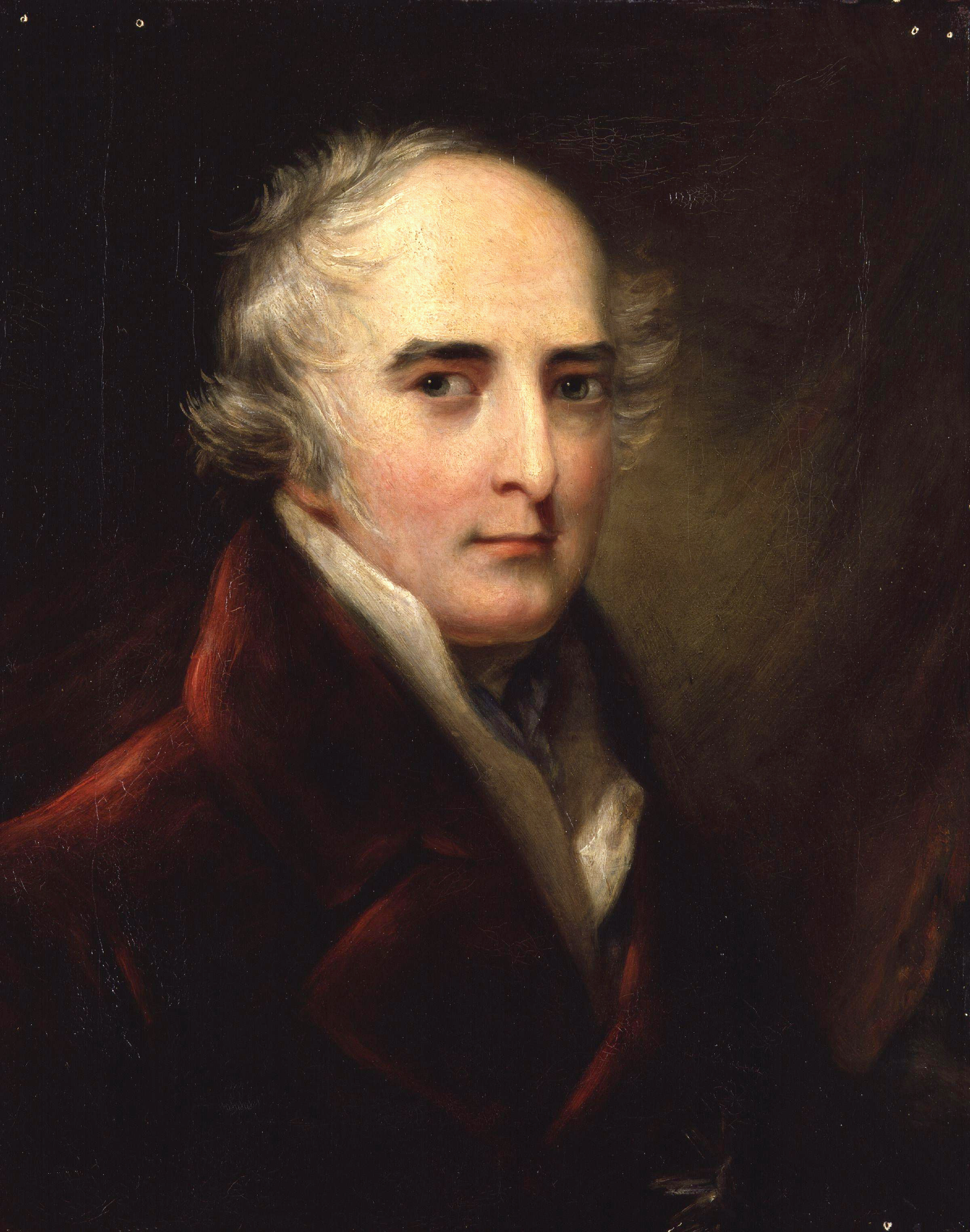
Richard Wellesley, 1st Marquess Wellesley, now at the National Portrait Gallery

John Philip "Pope" Davis (1784-1862), a portrait and subject painter, first exhibited at the Royal Academy in 1811.

His works exhibited at the 1818 Norwich Exhibitions were reviewed in the Norfolk Chronicle:

Portrait of the Rev. C. Penrice.— A picture of very strong and spirited conception : the countenance manly, but with that mixture of mildness which is among the first difficulties of painting to express.

Portrait of Mrs. Barker. This beautiful portrait, executed with spirit and taste. Mr. Davis's style in female portrait is elegance. He is fond of sun-set effects, and the light is thrown on this fair and gentle form with great knowledge chiaro-scuro, the attitude unstudied yet striking, the eye is mild and mental, and the countenance at once calm and full of sensibility. This picture has been already exhibited at Somerset-house, where we understand it as greatly admired. light.

Portrait of an Artist is an excellent likeness of Mr. Davis, finished with great clearness and delicacy.

Portrait of Capt. George Manby, author of the system for saving shipwrecked seamen on a lee shore, and by which lives have already been preserved.— This is a fine performance. Capt. Manby is represented in a rocky recess on the sea shore, ready for the application his apparatus ton ship in the offing. The attitude and scene are admirably historic : the figure is placed in position of great calmness and dignity - an erect and manly form, evidently conscious of the impending peril, yet evidently relying the resources which genius and experience have placed at its command. One hand grasps the folds of a loose coat, the othei rests without effort upon the barbed-shot, which forms so important a part of his system. The likeness, as far as we could ascertain from the universal opinion of the spectators, is a powerful one but to those unacquainted with the original, the charm must lie in its fidelity to character, the noble vigour with which it has expressed mind in the moment of its high exertion, and the utter freedom of the picture from eflort, or obscurity, or exaggeration. The adjuncts are happily conceived. The cave opens on the ocean : it is sunset, and the last light is descending in red and angry splendour on tire waves; the ship is struggling through the breakers, aud evidently on the verge of being wrecked. It is a picture altogether worthy of the rank which Mr, Davis sustains in his profession.—We understand this picture was painted for Sir Thomas Gooch 4th Baronet.

Portrait of Mrs. Gwynn. This is sweet and touching picture : the simplicity of the attitude admirably suited to the countenance — one of the most candid, pure, aud lovely, that we have ever seen.

His entry in Bryan's Dictionary of Painters and Engravers reads:

In 1824 he went to Rome, and painted 'The Talbot Family receiving the Papal Benediction:' whence his cognomen of 'Pope Davis.' He next year received a prize of £50 from the British Institution. With his friend Haydon, he was a great opponent of the Academy, where he did not exhibit after 1843. He died in 1862, and after his death was published his 'Thoughts on Great Painters.' His best-known work is 'The Love-Letter,' exhibited at the British Institution in 1826.
