= John Dennett =

English inventor of a life-saving rocket, and antiquarian (1790–1852)

John Dennett (1790–1852) was an English inventor and antiquary. He invented Dennett's Life-Saving Rocket Apparatus for saving shipwrecked crewmen in 1832, and appointed custodian of Carisbrooke Castle shortly before his death. He contributed to the British Archaeological Association's The Archaeological Journal.

== Life ==
John Dennett of Newport, Isle of Wight, was born in 1790.

=== "Dennett's" rockets ===
In 1832, or about 1826, he invented the life-saving rocket apparatus (known as "Dennett's") for conveying a rope from the shore to a shipwrecked crew. George William Manby had previously employed a grappling shot fired from a mortar for this purpose, first used to rescue the crew of the brig Elizabeth in 1808. Dennett's apparatus "resembled the old skyrocket", but had "an iron case instead of a paper one, and a pole eight feet long instead of a mere stick"; it weighed 23 lbs. (10.4 kg), was propelled by 9 lbs. (4 kg) of composition, and had a range of 250 yards (228.6 m). Dennett subsequently increased the range to 400 yards (365.8 m) by placing two rockets side by side on the same stick. But the action of these parallel rockets was unsatisfactory. A ship's crew off Bembridge, in the Isle of Wight, having been saved by means of Dennett's rocket, the board of customs had the apparatus supplied in 1834 to several coastguard stations. It was superseded in official use by the adoption of Edward Mounier Boxer's rocket in 1865. Dennett's rockets are said to have been sent to all parts of the world, and to have won for their inventor several honours from foreign sovereigns.

=== Other work ===
In 1816 he found a pair of Anglo-Saxon brooches in a chalk pit near Shalcombe into which the contents of a barrow had fallen.

Shortly before his death, Dennett was appointed custodian of Carisbrooke Castle. He had a practical knowledge of antiquities, and was a corresponding member of the British Archaeological Association. He contributed to its journal (vols. i–v) short accounts of various antiquities found in England, and read a paper on the barrows of the Isle of Wight at the Winchester congress of the association in 1845.

He died on 10 July 1852, aged sixty-two.

== See also ==
- Lifeboat (rescue)
- Lifesaving

== Sources ==
- Ballantyne, Robert M.; Dibdin, Charles; Thorson, Alfred T. (1911). "Life-Boat and Life-Saving Service". In Chisholm, Hugh (ed.). Encyclopædia Britannica. Vol. 16 (11th ed.). Cambridge UP. p. 605.
- Chambers, Robert, ed. (1886). "Life Mortars and Rockets". Chambers's Encyclopædia. Rev. ed. Vol. 10. London: W. & R. Chambers. pp. 605–606.
- Ross, John M., ed. (1878). "Life-Saving Apparatus". The Globe Encyclopædia of Universal Information. Vol. 4. Edinburgh: Thomas C. Jack, Grange Publishing Works. pp. 97–98.
- Wroth, W. W.; Cox, R. C. (2004). "Dennett, John (1789–1852), inventor of a life-saving rocket, and antiquary". Oxford Dictionary of National Biography. Oxford UP. Retrieved 7 September 2022.
- The Cornhill Magazine, Vol. 28. July–December 1873. London: Smith, Elder & Co. p. 72.
- The Gentleman's Magazine, Vol. 38, New Series. July–December 1852. London: John Bowyer Nichols and Son. pp. 319–320.
- The Journal of the British Archaeological Association, Vol. 9. 1854. London: J. R. Smith. p. 111.

Attribution:

- This article incorporates text from a publication now in the public domain: Wroth, Warwick William (1888). "Dennett, John". In Stephen, Leslie (ed.). Dictionary of National Biography. Vol. 14. London: Smith, Elder & Co. pp. 367–368.
