= John Bell (artillerist) =

English artillerist

- Born: 1 March 1747
- Died: 1 June 1798 (aged 51)
- Occupation: Artillerist

John Bell (1 March 1747 – 1 June 1798) was an English artillerist.

He was the eldest son of a hatter at Carlisle, Cumbria, where he was born. His father ruined himself in attempts to discover the longitude. In 1765 Bell joined the artillery. He served at Gibraltar and afterwards in England. He was at Southsea in 1782, and was an eye-witness of the foundering of the Royal George. He invented a plan for destroying the wreck, which was the same as one carried out by Colonel Pasley in 1839. He also invented the 'sun proof' for testing the soundness of guns, long in use in the Royal Arsenal. The proof stages were 1. Instrumental proof; 2. Fire proof; 3. Searcher; 4. Water proof followed by 5. Sun proof: This followed the water proof and used the sun (or a special candle) and a mirror to detect any holes or sponginess. The flaws being wet were more easily detectable.

He invented a 'gyn' called by his name. Bell's gyn was lighter weight and less powerful than the Gibraltar gyn.

He invented a petard, of which there is a model in the Woolwich laboratory; a crane for descending mines; and a harpoon for taking whales. For the last two of which he received premiums from the Society of Arts; and an apparatus for rescuing shipwrecked mariners, said to be identical with that afterwards devised by Captain Manby. For this he received a premium from the Society of Arts of fifty guineas.

In 1815 the House of Commons voted £500 to his daughter (Mrs. Whitfield) in recognition of the same invention. In 1793 the Duke of Richmond gave him a commission as second-lieutenant in the artillery.

== See also ==
- Manby mortar
- Coastguards of Yesteryear: "Manby Mortar or Rocket Apparatus"
