= Jacques Joseph Ducarne de Blangy =

- Born: December 11, 1728; France
- Died: April 18, 1808 (aged 79)
- Occupations: Agronomist, inventor
- Known for: Invention of the rescue bomb

Jacques Joseph Ducarne de Blangy (December 11, 1728 – April 18, 1808) was a French agronomist and inventor.

Although known for his beekeeping activity, he's better known as an inventor of the rescue bomb at the end of 18th century.

Over the English Channel British Army Sergeant (later Lieutenant) John Bell, Royal Artillery had in 1791 successfully demonstrated the use of a mortar to throw a line to shore and use it to float men to the shore, he had also suggested that these be held in ports to throw a line to a ship, he was awarded 50 Guineas by the Society for the Encouragement of Arts, Manufactures, and Commerce.

Captain George Manby carried out a successful demonstration of his apparatus before the Suffolk Humane Society and a very large assemblage of ladies and gentlemen at Lowestoft, on the 26th August and 10th September 1807, on the former John Rous, 1st Earl of Stradbroke, their President was present. It was this later design that achieved a wide degree of success and was copied and brought into use in a number of European countries.

== Published works ==
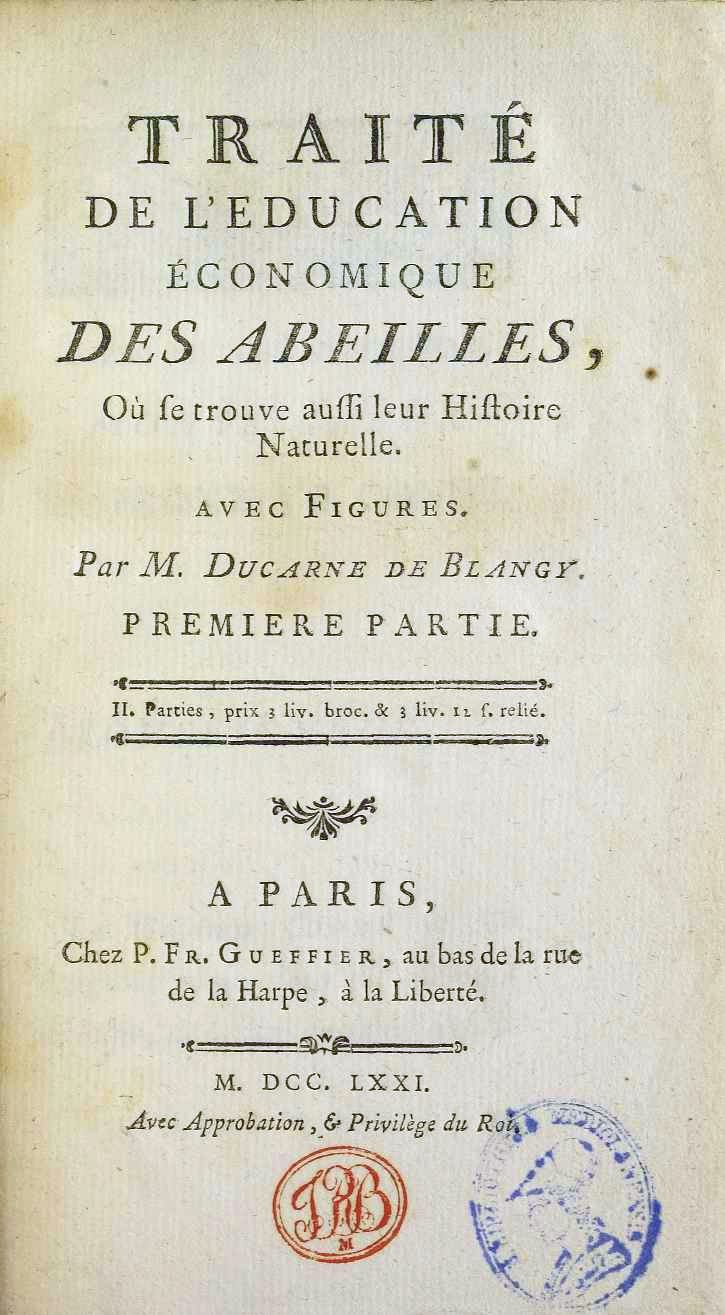
Traité de l'éducation économique des abeilles, 1771

- Méthode pour détruire les taupes, 1770, in-8°, avec figures.
- Traité de l'éducation économique des abeilles, où se trouve aussi leur histoire naturelle, Paris, 1771, 2 parties in-12, avec figures.
- Méthode pour recueillir les grains dans les années pluvieuses, et les empêcher de germer, Paris, 1771, in-12; ibid., 1784, et 1796, in-8°.
- Lettre à M. de V. (Voltaire) par un de ses amis sur l'ouvrage intitulé: l'Évangile du jour, Paris, 1771, in-8°.
- Deuxième lettre à Voltaire, 1772.
- Troisième lettre à Voltaire, 1773.
- À la Nation française, aux consuls de la République, à toutes les nations maritimes du globe et à toutes les sociétés savantes de l'Europe, ou Moyens propres à sauver les équipages d'une partie des vaisseaux qui viennent échouer et périr à la côte, Paris, 1801, in-8°, avec figures.
- Observations sur quelques points intéressants d'artillerie, ou Lettre au général *** sur les expériences relatives au transport d'une corde par une bombe ou un boulet, qui ont eu lieu à Vincennes, le 22 ventôse dernier., Paris, Blanchon, 1798.
- Traité de l'éducation économique des abeilles : auquel on a ajouté les nouvelles découvertes de M. Hubert sur cet insecte, Paris, 1802, in-12.
