= George William Manby =

English author and inventor

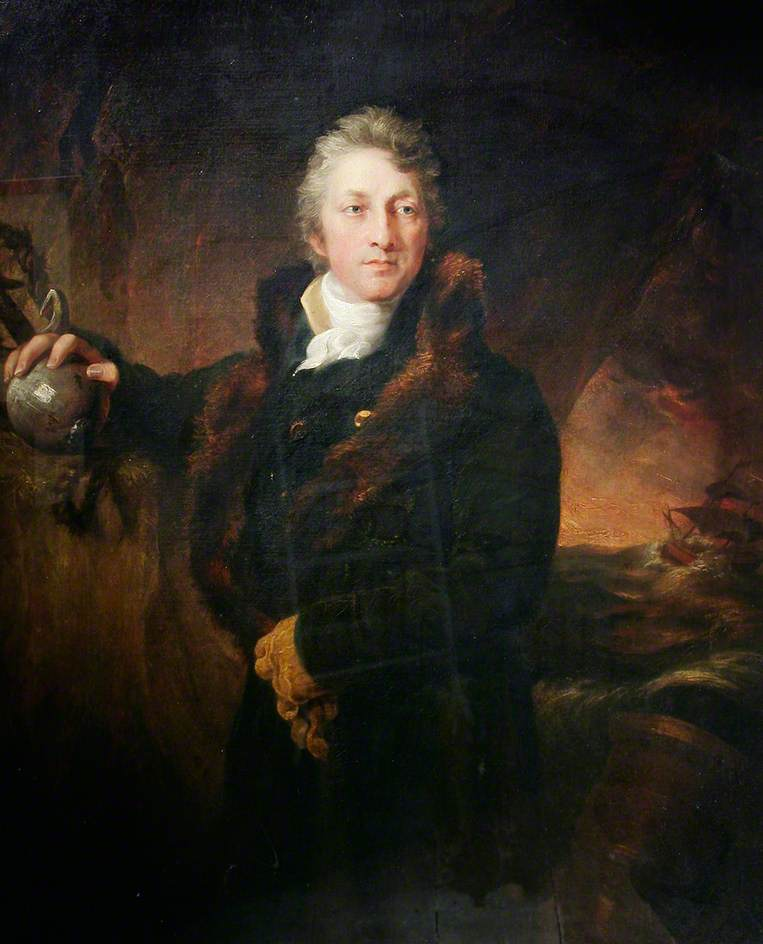
- George William Manby, portrait by John Philip Davis
- Born: 28 November 1765; Denver, Norfolk, England
- Died: 25 November 1854 (aged 88); Great Yarmouth, Norfolk
- Known for: Inventor of the Manby Mortar and an early form of fire extinguisher
- Relatives: Thomas Manby, brother

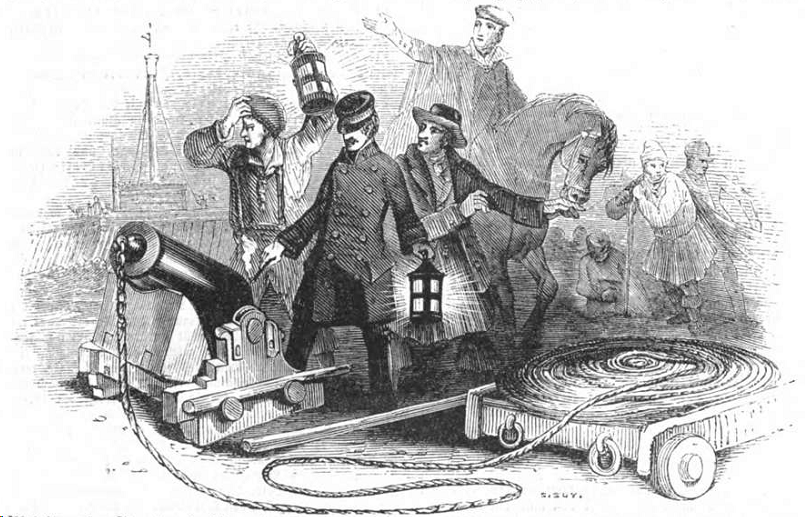
Manby mortar, 1842 drawing

Captain George William Manby FRS (28 November 1765 – 18 November 1854) was an English author and inventor. He designed an apparatus for saving life from shipwrecks and also the "Pelican Gun", the first modern form of fire extinguisher.

== Early life ==
Manby was born in the village of Denver on the edge of the Norfolk Fens. His parents were Mary Woodcock (1741-1783) and Captain Matthew Pepper Manby (1735-1774), lord of the manor of Wood Hall in Hilgay, a former soldier and aide-de-camp to Lord Townshend and barrack-master of Limerick at his death. A younger brother was Thomas Manby, naval officer. Manby went to school at Downham Market. Although he claimed to have been a friend there of Horatio Nelson, this is unlikely to be true as Nelson would have left the school (if he ever attended) before Manby started. He then went to the Free Grammar School in King's Lynn, where he was a student of Rev Dr David Lloyd (died 1794). He was one of the four stewards organising an anniversary event of Lloyd's students held at the Duke's Head Inn on 17 February 1791.

== Military life ==
He volunteered to fight in the American War of Independence, aged 17, but was rejected because of his youth and his small size. Instead, he entered the Royal Military Academy in Woolwich. He is listed as one of the Artillery cadets on 31 March 1784. On 21 April 1788, he obtained a commission as a Lieutenant in the Cambridgeshire Militia where he eventually gained the rank of captain. He left the regiment in Spring 1793. A fellow officer, and later regiment's colonel, was Charles Philip Yorke, later Secretary at War.

== Marriage and aftermath ==
In December 1793, he married the only daughter of Rev Dr Preston JP, of Waldingfield and Rougham, and inherited his wife's family's estates. In November 1797, his estate in the manor of Hilgay was put up for auction. He left her in 1801 after being shot by her lover Captain Pogson of the East India Company and moved to Clifton, Bristol. There, he published several books, including The History and Antiquities of St David's (1801), Fugitive Sketches of the History and Natural Beauties of Clifton (1802), and A Guide from Clifton to the Counties of Monmouth, Glamorgan, etc. (1802). These included illustrations by Manby, ranging from general views to plans and architectural drawings.

=== Manby's Drawings in Fugitive Sketches, 1802 ===
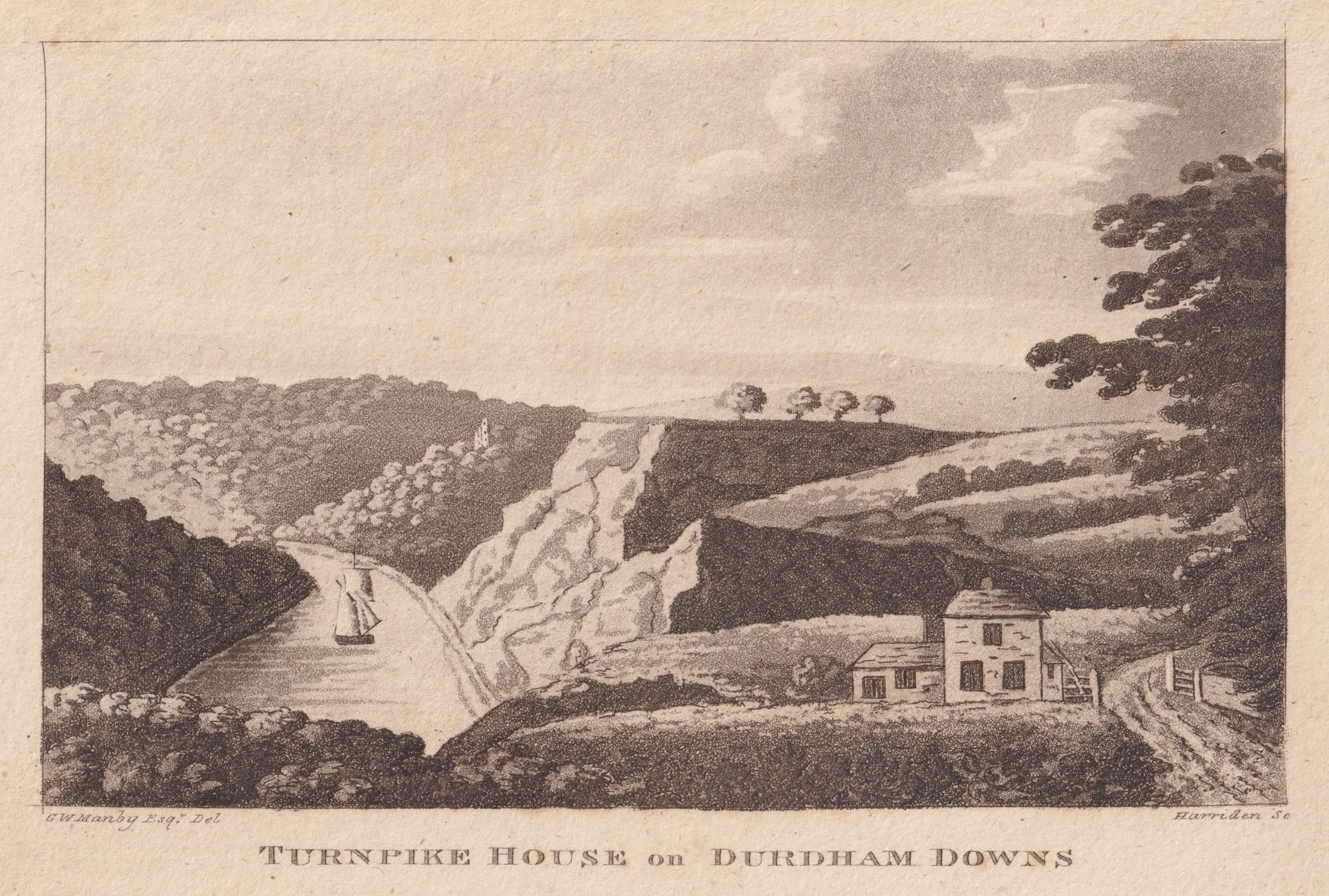
Turnpike House on Durdham Down, 1802

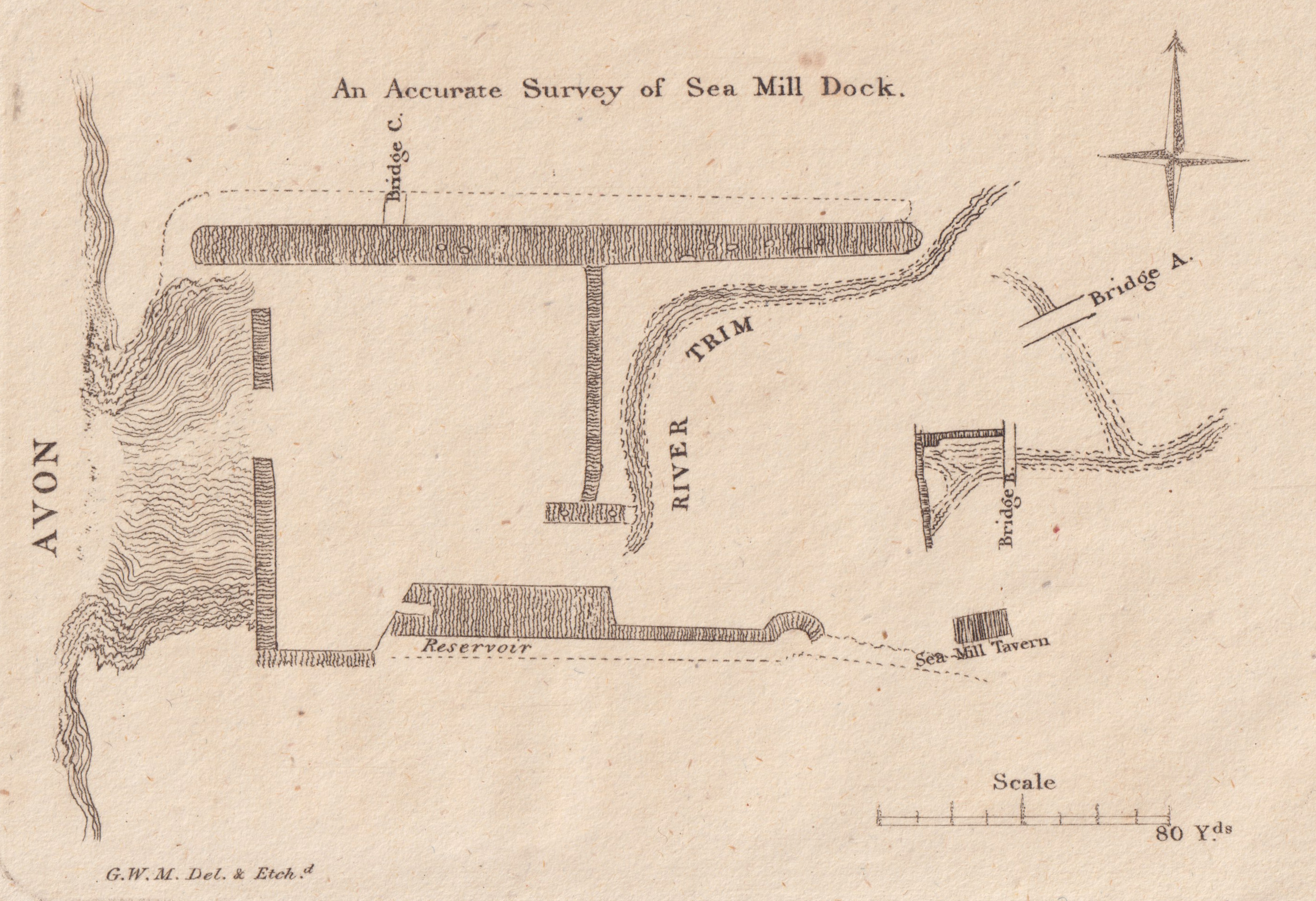
Survey of Sea Mills Dock, 1802

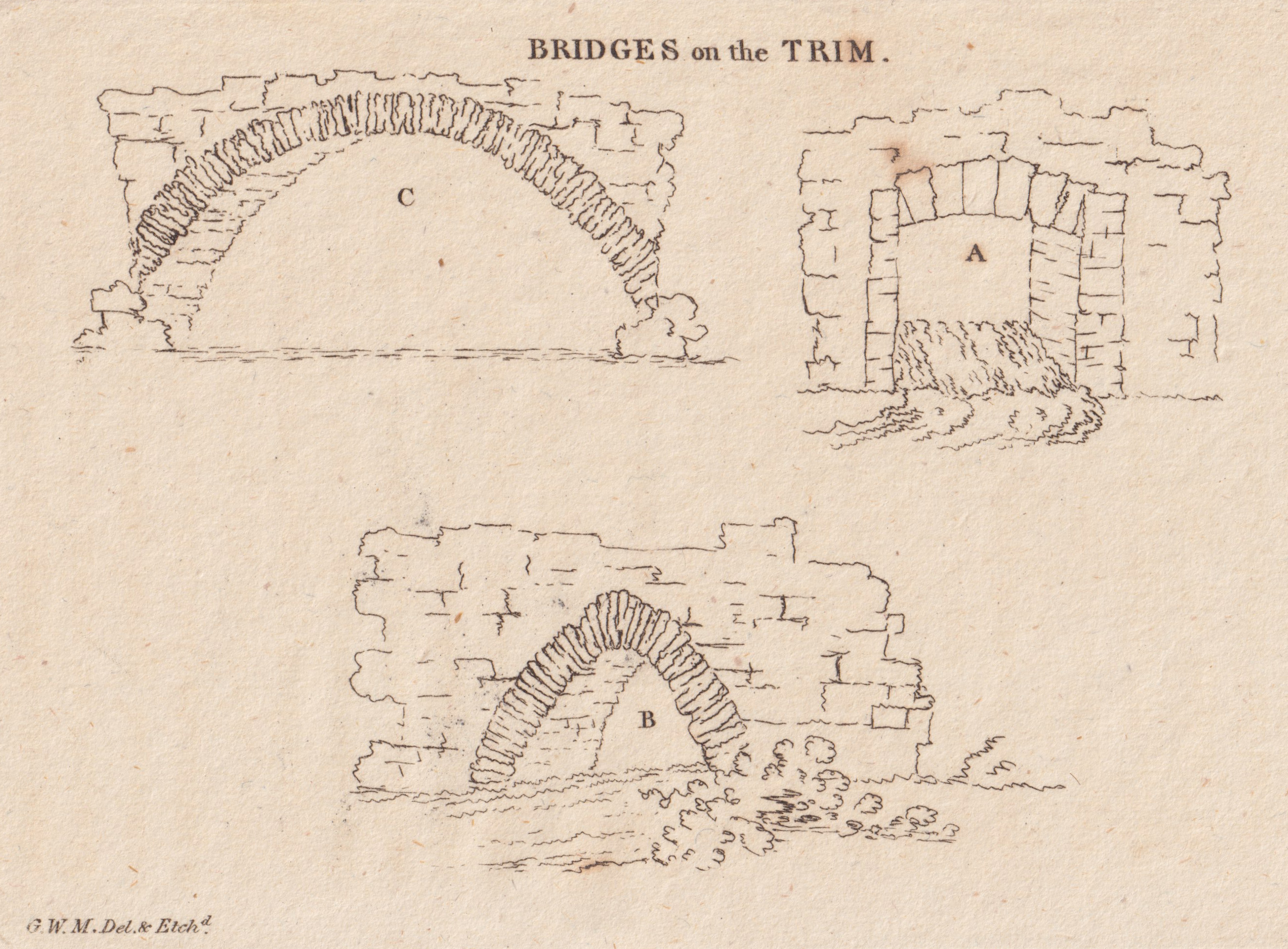
Elevation drawings of bridges at Sea Mills, 1802

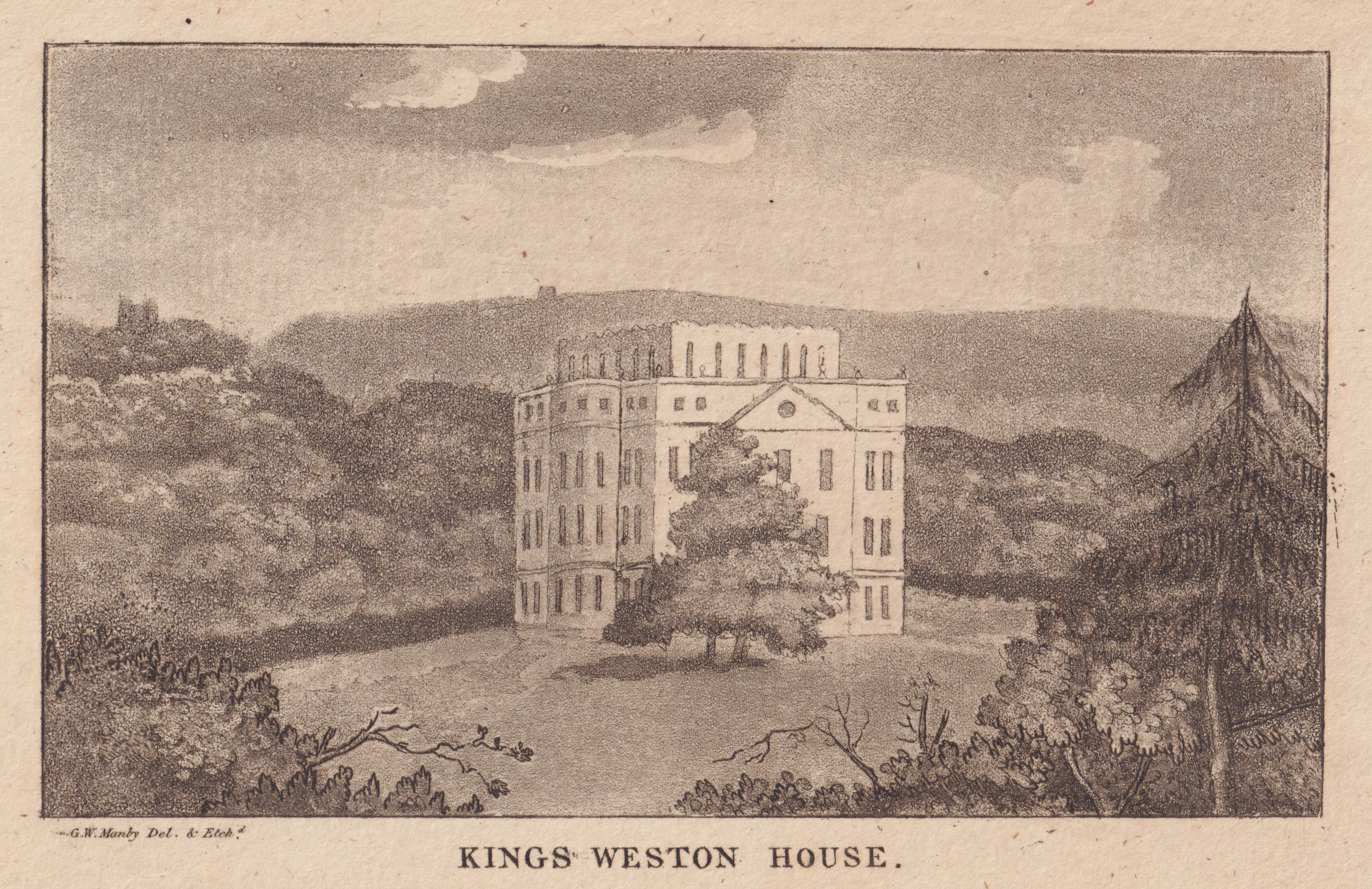
Kings Weston House, 1802

In 1803, Manby's pamphlet An Englishman's Reflexions on the Author of the Present Disturbances, on Napoleon's plans to invade England, came to the attention of the Secretary of War, Robert Hobart, 4th Earl of Buckinghamshire, who was impressed and recommended Manby to be appointed as Barrack-Master at Great Yarmouth in September, 1803.

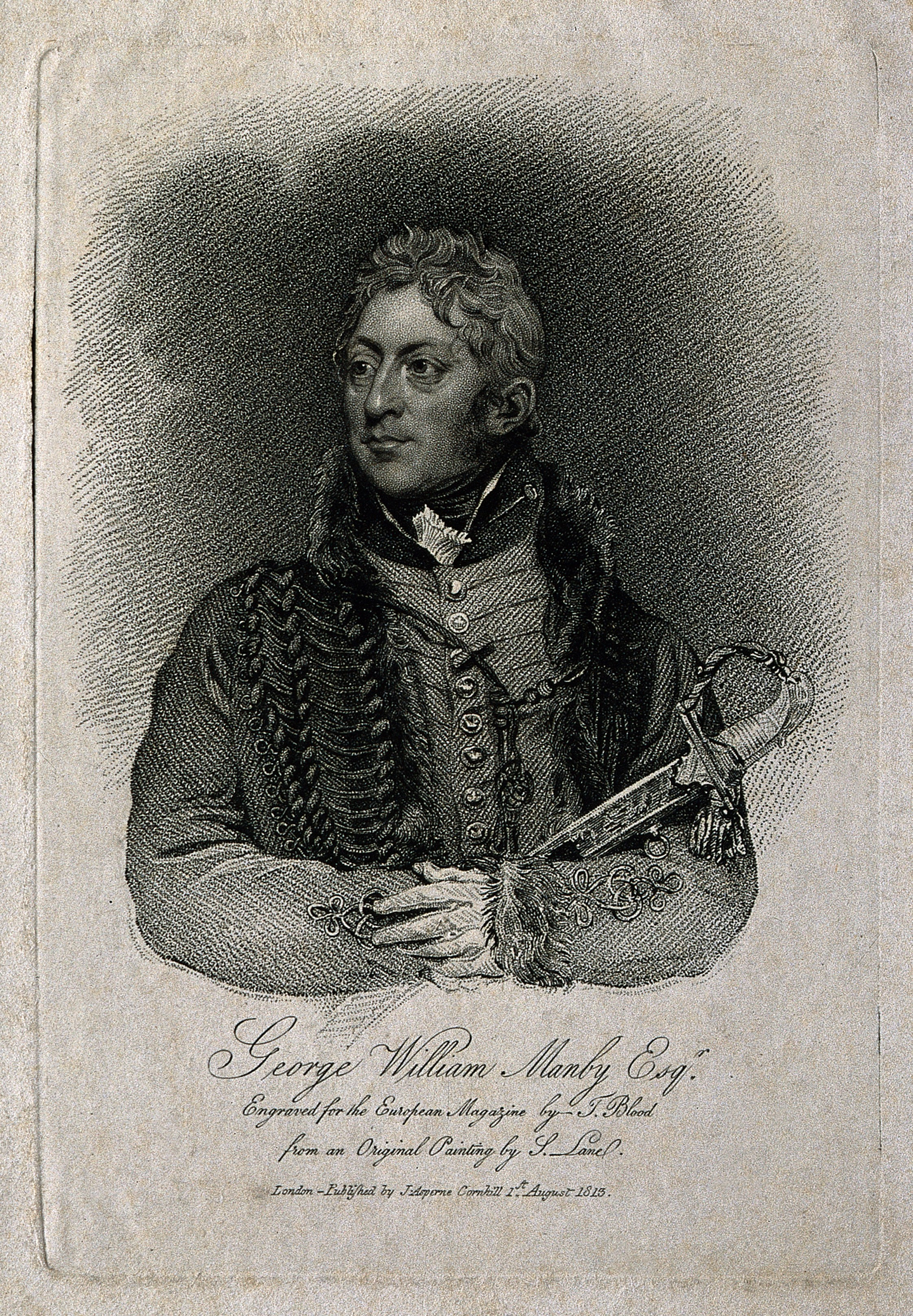
Stipple engraving by T. Blood (1813)

== Life-saving invention ==
On 18 February 1807, as a helpless onlooker, he witnessed a Royal Navy ship, HMS Snipe, carrying French prisoners run aground 50 yards off Great Yarmouth during a storm. Several vessels were wrecked and (according to some accounts) a total of 214 people drowned, including French prisoners of war, women and children. The figure of '67 brave men' for the Snipe was quoted in the House of Commons in June 1808. Following this tragedy, Manby experimented with mortars, and so invented the Manby Mortar, (later to be used with the breeches buoy), that fired a thin rope from shore into the rigging of a ship in distress. A strong rope, attached to the thin one, could be pulled aboard the ship. His successful invention supposedly followed an experiment as a youth in 1783, when he shot a mortar carrying a line over Downham church.

Manby carried out a successful demonstration of his apparatus before the Suffolk Humane Society, and a very large assemblage of ladies and gentlemen at Lowestoft, on 26 August and 10 September 1807. On the former occasion, their president, John Rous, 1st Earl of Stradbroke, attended.

Sergeant (later Lieutenant) John Bell, Royal Artillery, had in 1791 successfully demonstrated the use of a mortar to throw a line to shore and use it to float men to the shore, and had also suggested that mortars be held in ports to be available to throw a line to a ship. He was awarded 50 guineas by the Society for the Encouragement of Arts, Manufactures, and Commerce (now the Royal Society of Arts). Another earlier design, similar to Manby's invention, had been made in the late 18th century by the French agronomist and inventor Jacques Joseph Ducarne de Blangy. Manby's invention was independently conceived, and there is no suggestion that he copied de Blangy's idea.

In 1808, the crew of a brig was rescued at Yarmouth by the use of Manby's device fired from a carriage gun and supervised by Manby.

Captain G Manby's invention of throwing a rope to a ship stranded on a lee shore, for the purpose of saving the crew, proved the certainty of its never-failing success on the Elizabeth of Plymouth, that was wrecked on the beach at Yarmouth in the tremendous gale of the 12th instant; the master, who is part owner, making so grateful an affidavit before the Mayor of that place, he expressed a desire to see the experiment tried, which took place on Monday last, in the presence of Vice Admiral Douglas, several officers of the navy, the merchants, and many persons from different parts of the coast; the wind was blowing very fresh on shore, and the spot chosen 130 yards from a stranded brig, with all her emblems of distress flying. A galloper carriage, drawn by one horse, brought, with considerable expedition, every requisite for the service; a 5 1/2 inch royal mortar being dismounted, a 1 1/4 inch rope (having a 24 pounder shot appended to it) was staked in its front; about 2 feet from the shot the rope passed through a collar of leather, effectually preventing its burning; being projected by one pound of powder, more than 100 yards over the vessel, part of the rope fell upon the rigging; the persons on board returning a rope by the one sent, hauled off a stout rope, with a smaller one rove through a tailed block; the larger being made fast to the foot of the main top mast, the other end to a long, gun tackle, secured to three iron-shod stakes, driven triangularly in the ground; the tackle being bowsed, kept the rope sufficiently tight, and by persons easing off the fall, as the ship rolled, prevented danger to the rope, or to what it was lashed being carried away; the tailed block was made fast under the large rope, and each end of the small rope to the extremities of a ham-mock, extended by a stretcher of wood, (fitted up like the pole of a tent, for the convenience of a carriage), having gudgeons with forelock pins, through which was rove the great rope. By the assistance of one person from the shore, the hammock travelled to and fro, bringing all the people who were assembled in the main top, one by one, in perfect ease and safety; a service that can always be performed, when it is impossible for any boat to give the least assistance and be done when persons are initiated in the several uses, in a quarter an hour. Every person present testified their highest approbation, and several gave certificates that had a similar system and apparatus been placed at Lowestoft, Yarmouth, Winterton and Happisbro', on the 18th Feb 1807 (on which distressing day the idea first suggested itself to the inventor), more than 100 persons would have been saved. It is most earnestly to be hoped it will be generally adopted, being a circumstance of such magnitude to this country, and deeply interesting to the world at large.

Manby was one of those to receive an honorary award at the Annual Festival of the Royal Humane Society in the May following the rescue.

In June 1808, Manby received a gold medal from The Society for the Encouragement of Arts, Manufactures, and Commerce, via the hands of Henry Howard, 13th Duke of Norfolk, for forming a communication with ships by means of a rope thrown over the vessel from a mortar gun on the shore.

In August 1808, Manby received a medallion from the Suffolk Humane Society.

Following the awards he later made a demonstration to the armed forces of the use of his apparatus.

SHIPWRECKED MARINERS.--On Tuesday last a most interesting and highly important experiment was made at Woolwich, by Captain MANBY, of Yarmouth, on a Vessel at anchor in the Thames, upwards of 100 yards from the shore, before a Committee of General Officers of Artillery, Commissioner CUNNINGHAM, Admiral LOSACK and several Officers of the Royal Navy, for the purpose of effecting a communication with a Ship stranded on a lee shore, and to bring the crew in perfect safety from the wreck. A rope was projected from a Royal Mortar across the Ship supposed to be stranded, by which was hauled on board by the crew a large rope, to be made fast to the mast-head, and kept at a proper degree of tension for a cot to travel on it, by a tackle purchase, that likewise admitted of the vessel's rolling : at the same time was sent to the ship a tailed block, with a small rope rove through it; each end of the small rope was made fast to the ends of the cot, that conveyed it to the Ship, and brought a person in perfect safety to the shore. The whole service was performed in a quarter of an hour, to the utmost gratification and highest approbation of every one present, particularly several eminent naval characters, who were heard to congratulate and express their warmest encomiums to the inventor for his very ingenious and laudable contrivance.

The device was successfully used in rescues by Sea Fencibles from Great Yarmouth and Winterton in 1810 The Official Copy of a Report from the Committee of Field Officers of Artillery, containing an Account of the Experiments made at Woolwich on 18 and 20 May 1811 alluded to the work of Lieutenant Bell, RA and his successful demonstration of a mortar to shoot a line in 1791.

Lifeboat and Manby Apparatus Going Off to a Stranded Vessel by J.M.W. Turner, 1831

Manby's invention was officially adopted in 1814, and a series of mortar stations were established around the coast. It was estimated that by the time of his death in 1854 nearly 1,000 persons had been rescued from stranded ships by means of his apparatus.

Manby also built an "unsinkable" boat. The first test indeed proved it to be floating when mostly filled with water; however, the seamen (who disliked Manby) rocked the boat back and forth so that it eventually turned over. The boatmen depended on the cargo left over from shipwrecks, and may have thought Manby's mortar a threat to their livelihood.

The property that Manby owned in Yarmouth Denes was advertised in an auction notice in 1812 as he was leaving Yarmouth. In February 1813, Manby gave a lecture to the Highland Society of Edinburgh followed by a demonstration on Bruntsfield links, Edinburgh. The gun was fired by use of a chemical to set off the charge, to overcome the problems caused by gunpowder getting damp in the storm conditions often experienced when carrying out rescues. In 1813, Manby invented the 'Extincteur', the first portable pressurised fire extinguisher. This consisted of a copper vessel of 3 gallons of pearl ash (potassium carbonate) solution contained within compressed air. He also invented a device intended to save people who had fallen through ice. In July 1813, Manby's profile was increased when his portrait featured in the European Magazine.

On Friday 30 August 1816, a committee of the Board of Ordnance and Lords of the Admiralty observed a demonstration of Manby's fire extinguisher and other equipment.

== Later life ==
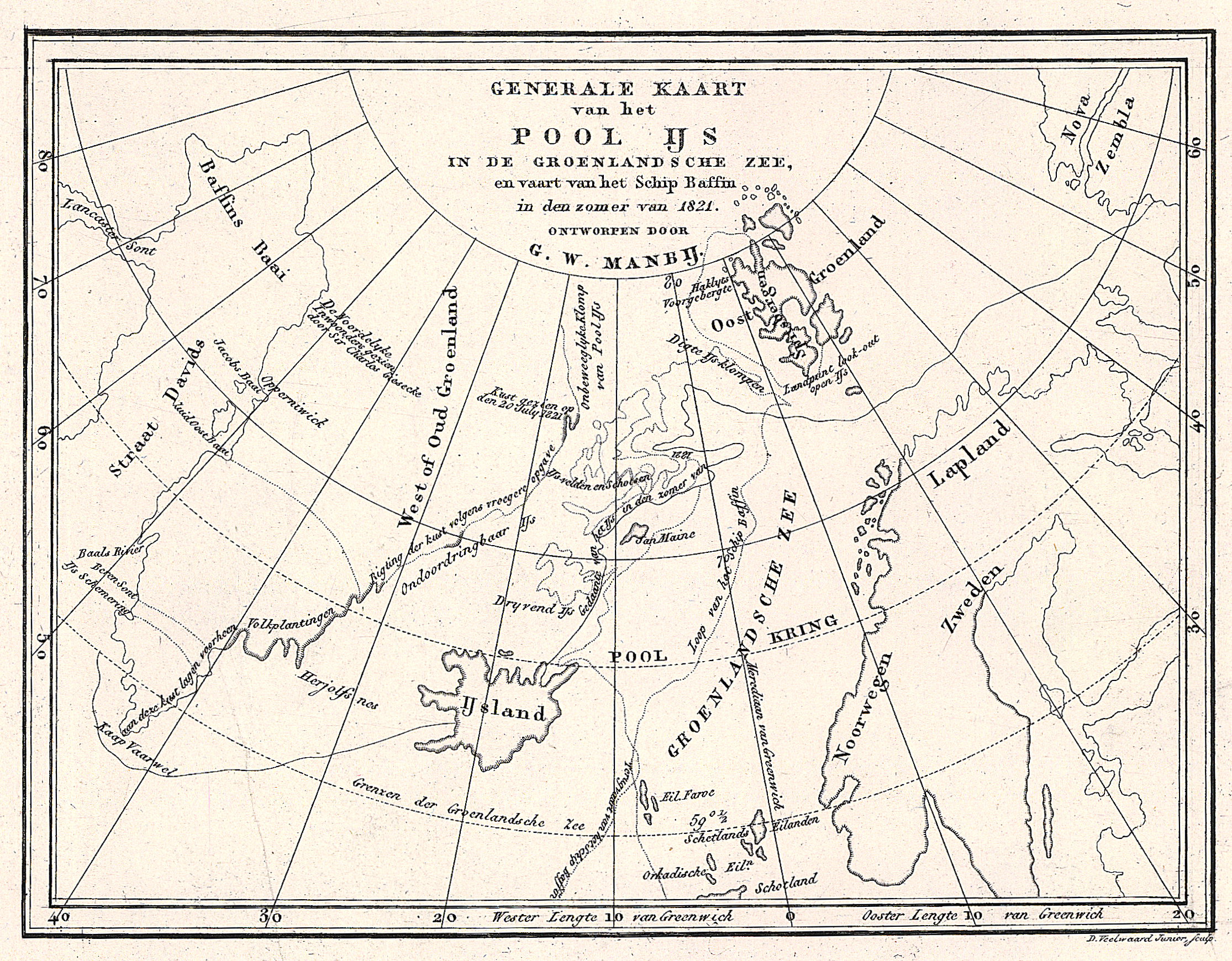
Map of Manby's journey in 1821

On 10 March 1818, he married Sophia Gooch, daughter of Sir Thomas Gooch, 4th Baronet. In 1821, he sailed to Greenland with William Scoresby, for the purpose of testing a new type of harpoon for whaling, based on the same principles as his mortar (see explosive harpoon). However, his device was sabotaged by the whalers. He published his account in 1822 as Journal of a Voyage to Greenland, containing observations on the flora and fauna of the Arctic regions as well as the practice of whale hunting.

As a result of that voyage, Manby espoused three ideas: that there might still be Norse survivors in the so-called 'Lost Colony' in East Greenland; that Britain should claim the area of East Greenland north of the area claimed by Denmark; and that this area should be developed as a penal colony.

The House of Commons committee of supply voted Manby £2,000 for his lifesaving apparatus in June 1823. In the October the King of Denmark (via his consul) presented Manby with a gold medal "accompanied with a letter, communicating His Majesty's gracious approbation of his philanthopic and arduous exertions in saving the crews of shipwrecked vessels."

Manby was present at the London Tavern on 4 March 1824 when was founded the National Institution for the Preservation of Life from Shipwreck, later to become the RNLI. He was one of the first five persons to receive their gold medal in 1825.

In 1825, the King of Sweden (via the mayor of Yarmouth) presented Manby with a splendid medallion in token of his Majesty's approbation of the Captain's humane merit, and inventions.

He gave evidence in connection with Norwich and Lowestoft Navigation Bill in 1826. He stated that for the purpose of establishing a system for the saving of lives from shipwreck, he had in 1810 by directions of the Admiralty, surveyed the line of coast from the southern extremity of Suffolk to the northern extremity of Norfolk, and in 1812, pursuant to an Address of the House of Commons, he had also by directions surveyed the coast from the southern extremity of Norfolk to the Firth of Forth.

Manby became one of the godfathers of Augustus Onslow Manby Gibbes (1828–1897), the youngest son of the Collector of Customs for Great Yarmouth from 1827 to 1833, Colonel John George Nathaniel Gibbes (1787–1873).

On 4 August 1830, he attended court and presented King William IV with a Treatise on the Preservation of Mariners from Stranded Vessels, and the Prevention of Shipwreck, with a Statement of the number of subjects of different nations saved by that plan, by Sir Robert Peel. He was the first to advocate a national fire brigade, and is considered by some to be a true founder of the RNLI. He was elected a Fellow of the Royal Society in 1831 in recognition of his many accomplishments.

In 1837, Manby was the tenant of a cottage near the Royal Barracks.

In April 1838, Charles Wood, aged 17, a drummer in the 1st battalion Grenadier Guards was killed by a fall caused by a faulty component when carrying out a Trial of Manby's apparatus for fire rescues from buildings.

Manby received a silver medal from the Society for the Protection of Life from Fire in May 1838. In June 1838, a newspaper stated in an advert he was a director of the 'SUB-MARINE and WRECK-WEIGHING ASSOCIATION' for Recovering the Cargoes and Hulls of Stranded Vessels, and for Preserving the Lives of the Crews of Vessels in Distress. To be incorporated by Act Parliament.

In 1838 he met Marshal Soult as part of his campaign to involve France and other nations in achieving a worldwide policy for the treatment of shipwrecked mariners and their cargos.

Manby received a belated Queen Victoria Gold Coronation Medal in March 1842.

Sophia died in October 1843.

== Retirement ==
Manby's post as Barrack-master was terminated and he was required to move out of his accommodation. Manby, obsessed with Nelson, later turned his home 'Pedestal House' into a Nelson museum filled with memorabilia, even having an internal wall knocked down to create a Nelson Gallery, and living in the basement. A letter to the local paper in 1845 describes Manby as a Freeman of Yarmouth.

Following a meeting chaired by Yarmouth's mayor in 1849, Manby's apparatus was exhibited at the Great Exhibition in 1851 and was awarded a medal. In 1852, it was reported he had donated part of his collection, the 'Nelson Cabinet' to King's Lynn museum. Her Majesty presented Captain Manby with the sum of £100 from the Royal Bounty Fund in December 1852. Aged eighty-nine, he died on 18 November 1854 in Great Yarmouth and was buried at All Saints, Hilgay on the 24th. The contents of Pedestal House were auctioned on Tuesday 19 December 1854.

Pedestal House and the 'Manby Crest' public house were auctioned on 28 May 1855 at the Star Inn.

== Legacy ==
Manby's portrait was exhibited at the 1808 Royal Academy in 1808. A portrait of Manby by John Philip Davis was exhibited at the 1818 Norwich Exhibitions, the picture was thought to be intended for Sir Thomas Gooch, 4th Baronet.

A plaque in the All Saints church, Hilgay reads

IN THE CHURCHYARD NEAR THIS SPOT REST THE BONES OF GEORGE WILLIAM MANBY CAPTAIN. F.R.S. A NAME TO BE REMEMBERED AS LONG AS THERE CAN BE A STRANDED SHIP. HE DIED NOV'R 18. 1854, AGED 88 years. OUT OF HIS EIGHT BROTHERS AND SISTERS, THE LARGE MARBLE STONE ALSO RECORDED THE DEATHS OF MARY JANE AUGUST 3rd 1772 AGED 10 YEARS. JOHN MAY 20th 1783 AGED 10 YEARS, AND OF TWO INFANTS.

An inscription underneath reads 'The public should have paid this tribute.'

The obituary published by the 1 December 1854 edition of the British Army Despatch states that Manby died on 25 November 1854.

There not being sufficient funds to erect a monument, wooden railings were placed around the grave. In 1856 the executor Mr S Yallop and the rector launched a public appeal for donations for a monument.

A portrait of Manby by Samuel Lane was passed on to the Royal Society by a family member.

Etchings of Manby by his friend Mary Dawson Turner are in the National Portrait Gallery.

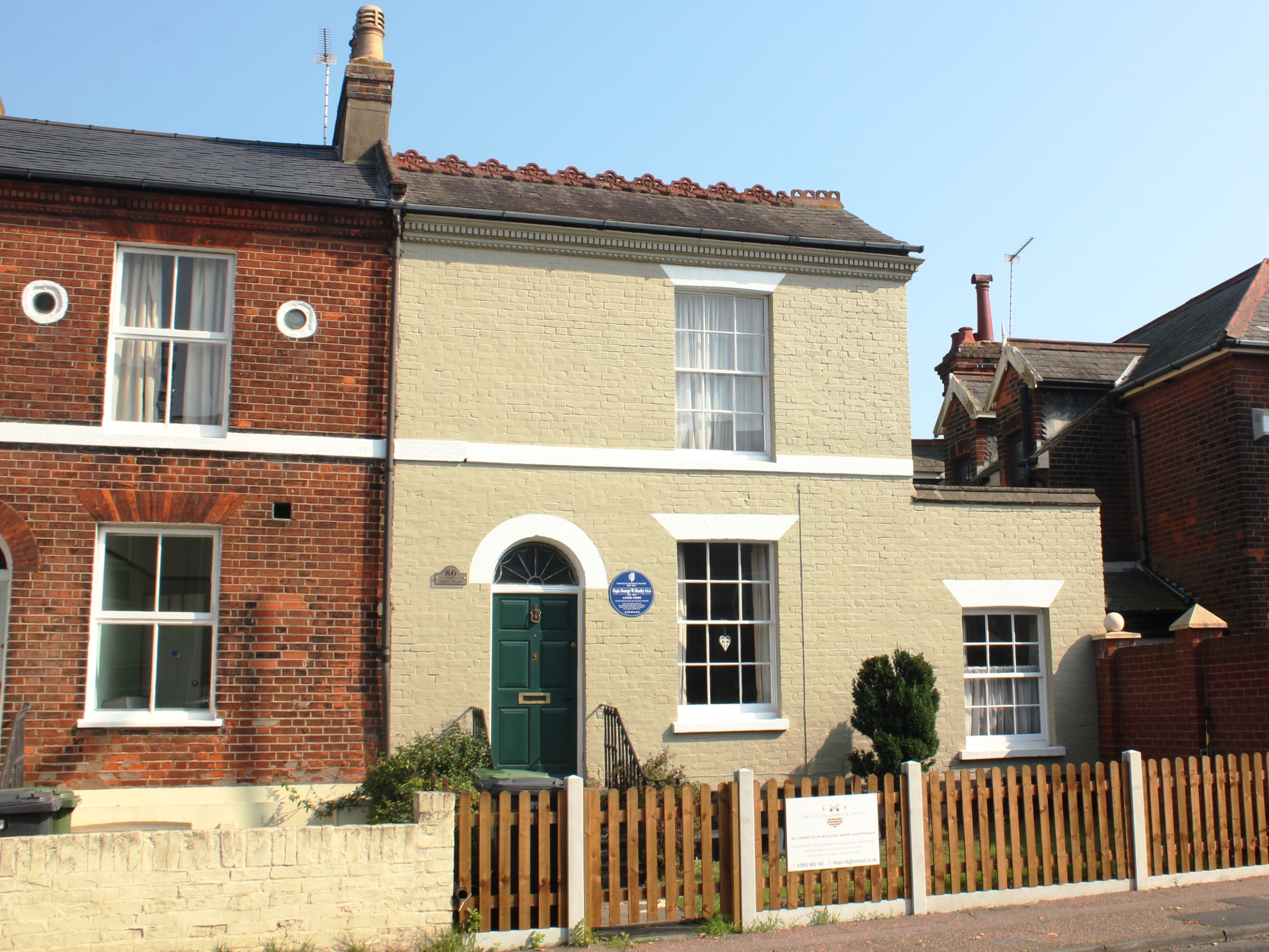
Manby House

His former home, now called 'Manby House' and 'Ahoy' are now listed buildings.

The plaque he had erected at his Yarmouth home is now in the Norfolk museums collection described as – Slate plaque, black, from the rear of Captain Manby's house in Southtown Great Yarmouth, commemorating the first life saved from drowning by use of Manby's mortar; inscribed with gold block letters 'In commemoration of the 12th of February 1808 on which day directly eastward of this spot the first life was saved from shipwreck, by means of a rope attached to a shot propelled by the force of gunpowder over the stranded vessel a method now universally adopted and to which at least 1000 sailors different nations owe their preservation 1842'

A lifeboat at Boulogne-sur-Mer was named the Captain George Manby. The Lifeboat was presented to the Society Humaine by the City of Boulogne. The Hilgay village sign features a Manby Mortar.

In 1967 a documentary on the inventor was made. Locations included Denver, Downham Market and Great Yarmouth. Scenes include the use of the mortar, rocket and breeches buoy. The recording is now available on the East Anglian Film Archive website.

Denver Historical Society had a Blue Plaque erected on the property he was born in – 'Easthall Manor', Sluice Road, Denver.

A Toby Carvery in Great Yarmouth bears the name 'Captain Manby'.

In 2015 an unpublished Manby book was sold – Reminiscences described unpublished, 1839? Provenance: The book was accompanied by a manuscript note reading: "This work never was completed or published – was the printer's own copy. D. Turner had only "A set of the rough proof sheets. Sold at the sale of his library May 1889. Lot 1121 – and one copy bound lot. 721 in catalogue."

== Awards ==
No.1 Queen's Gold Coronation Medal "as a mark of the sense she entertains of the usefulness of his inventions in the Preservation of Lives from Shipwreck." No.2. A gold medal from Charles X, King of the French, 1828. No.3. Gold medal from William, King of the Netherlands, 1830. No.4. Gold medal from Frederick, King of Denmark. No.5 Gold medal from Charles. XIV, King of Sweden and Norway. No.6. Gold medal from the Royal National Institution for the Preservation of Life from Shipwreck, (London), voted 15 Dec. 1830. No.7. Gold medal from the Society of Arts, Adelphi, London. No.8. Gold medal from the Highland Society of Scotland No.9. Silver medal from the Royal Humane Society, London. No.10 Silver medal from the Suffolk Humane Society. No.11. Silver medal from the Norfolk Association for saving Lives from Shipwreck, 1824. No.12. Silver medal from the Society for the Protection of Life from Fire.

== Works ==
- ___ (1801). The History and Antiquities of St David's. Harding.
- ___ (1802). An Historic and Picturesque Guide from Clifton, through the Counties of Monmouth, Glamorgan, and Brecknock, with Representations of Ruins, Interesting Antiquities &c. Fenley & Baylis.
- ___ (1802). Fugitive Sketches of the History and Natural Beauties of Clifton and the Hot-Wells and Vicinity. Norton & son.
- ___ (1803). An Englishman's reflections on the subject of the present disturbances. Yarmouth.
- ___ (1812). An essay on the preservation of shipwrecked persons : with a descriptive account of the apparatus and the manner of applying it, as adopted successfully by G. W. Manby; illustrated with engravings on wood drawn by W. M. Craig and executed by J. Berryman. Longman, Hurst, Rees, Orme, & Brown.
- ___ (1813). Papers Relating to Captain Manby's Plan for Saving the Lives of Ship-Wrecked Mariners. House of Commons.
- ___ (1814). A Description of the various Methods for Saving Shipwrecked Seamen. Longman, Hurst, Rees, Orme and Brown.
- ___ (1816). Considerations on destructive fires : and the means of prevention in future. W Calvert.
- ___ (1817). An Historical Guide to Great Yarmouth in Norfolk with the Most Remarkable Events Recorded of that Town. Barber & Webster.
- ___ (1822). Journal Of A Voyage To Greenland In The Year 1821. G & WB Whittaker.
- Manby, George William (1823). Journal Of A Voyage To Greenland In The Year 1821. Second edition. G & WB Whittaker.
- ___ (1830). An essay on the extinction and prevention of destructive fires. G W Manby.
- ___ (1835). An Englishman's reflections on the subject of the present disturbances, and more particularly on the matter author of them. G W Manby.
- ___ (1838). An address to the British public : with suggestions for the recovering property from sunken vessels; also, for the means for rescuing the lives of sailors from stranded vessels; and for the prevention of shipwreck; likewise, on the extinction and prevention of destructive fires; and for rescuing persons from houses enveloped in flames: and for saving from drowning persons who break through the ice. With a description and representation of apparatus used for those purposes, and instructions for their application. London: John Gathercole.
- ___ (1851). Commemorative Address on the Exhibition of Works of Industry of all Nations. G W Manby.
- ___ (1851). A summary of services rendered to the state. G W Manby.
- ___ (1851). Anastatic drawings of gold and silver medals, presented by sovereigns and public bodies to Capt. George William Manby. G W Manby.

== See also ==
- Coastguards of Yesteryear: "Manby Mortar or Rocket Apparatus"
- Henry Trengrouse
- Gunville#John Dennett, rocket inventor
