= Breeches buoy =

Rescue device for transport along a taut rope

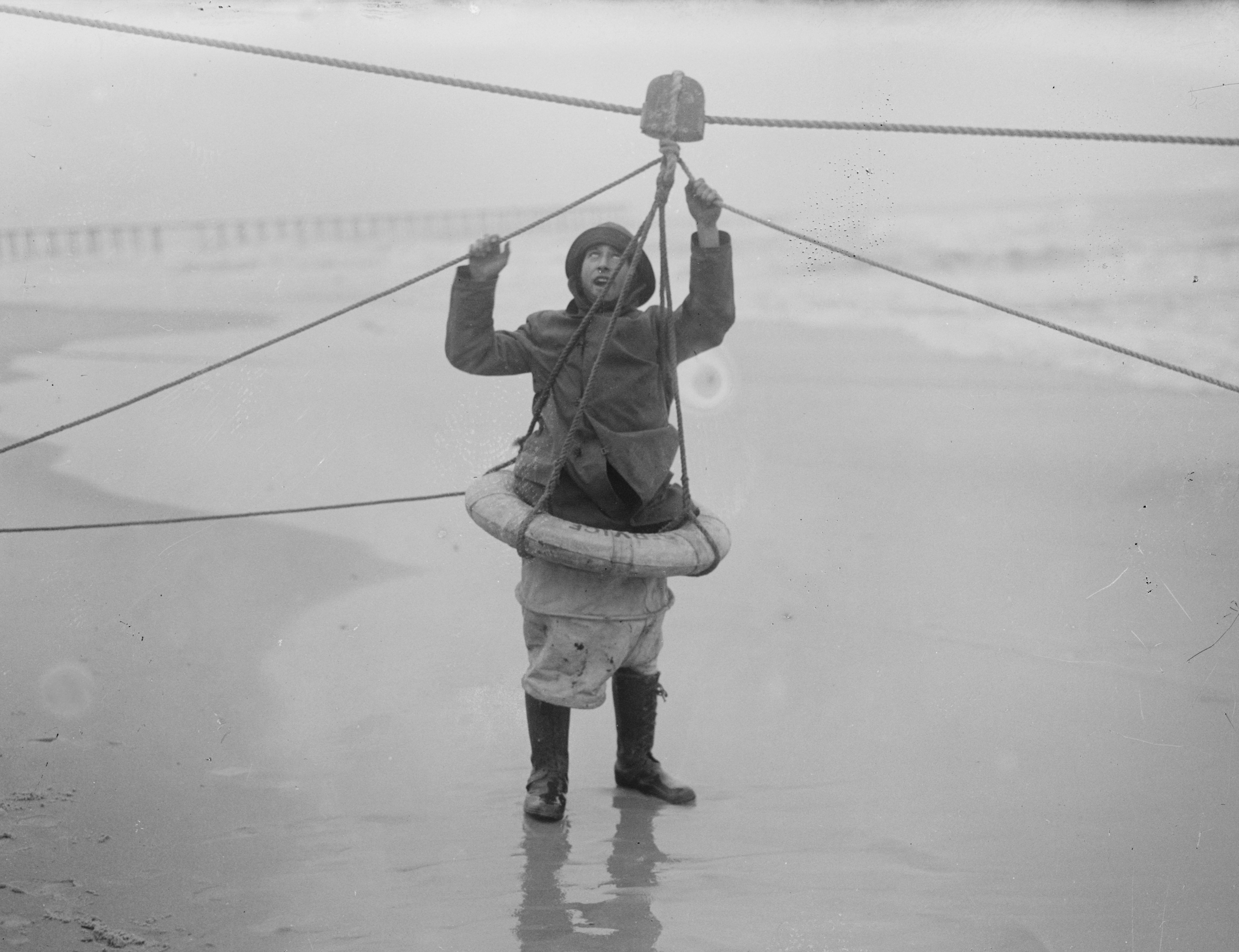
Breeches buoy during the rescue of the SS Northern Pacific on January 2, 1919

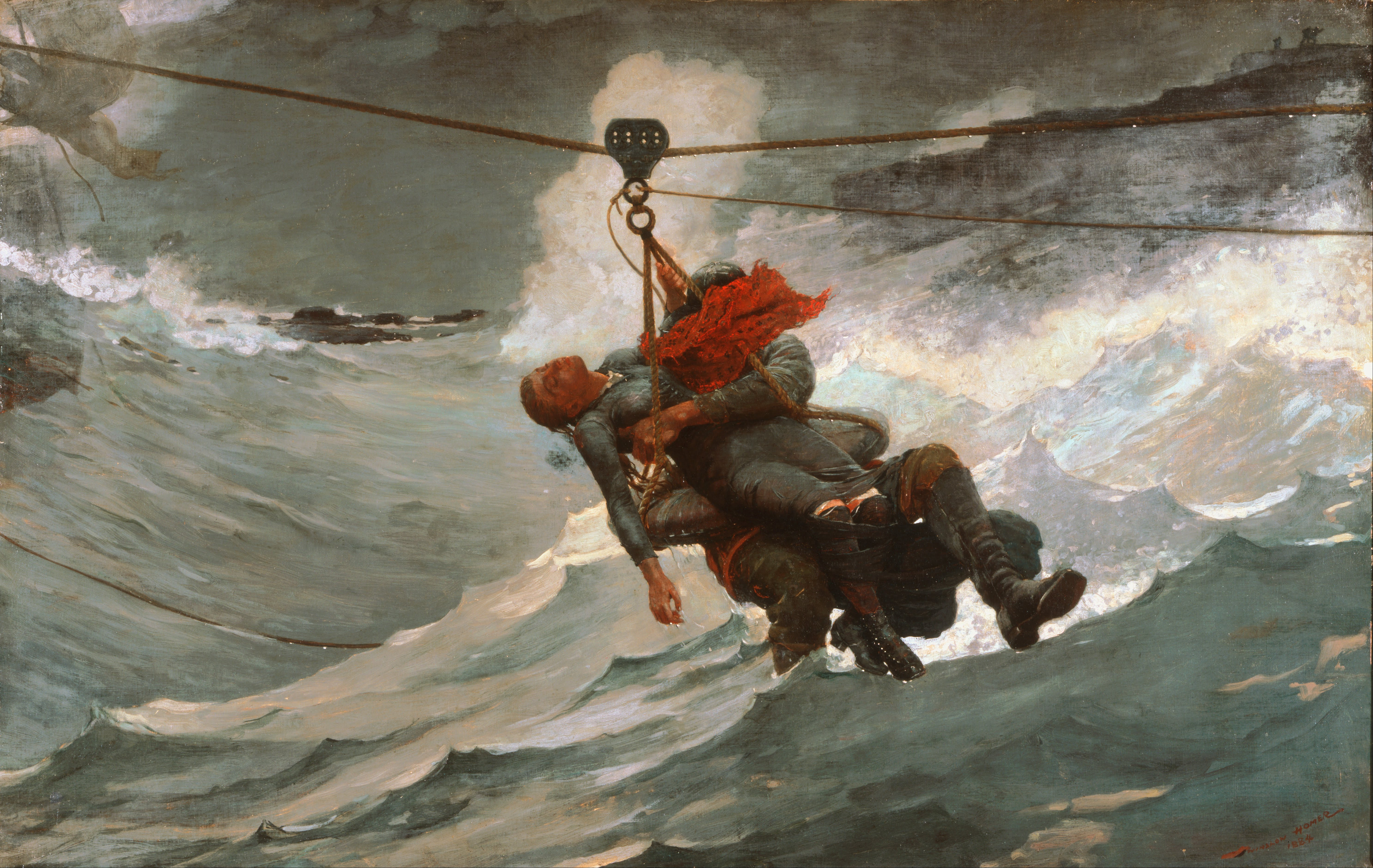
The Life Line, by Winslow Homer, 1884, depicts a breeches buoy in use during a rescue operation.

A breeches buoy is a rope-based rescue device used to extract people from wrecked vessels, or to transfer people from one place to another in situations of danger. The device resembles a round emergency personal flotation device with a leg harness attached. It is similar to a zip line. The breeches buoy may be deployed from shore to ship, ship to ship, or ship to shore using a Manby mortar, rocket, kite system, or a Lyle gun, and allows evacuation of one person at a time. A line is attached to the ship, and the person being rescued is pulled to shore in the breeches buoy.

== History ==
An early rescue using the equipment took place in 1866.

The correspondent of the Scotsman, wrote:

A very violent gale from the came on yesterday, with thunder and lightning, and the night was extremely stormy. number of heavily-laden collier brigs had sailed on the preceding day for the Baltic, and people became very anxious about their safety, and are so yet. The wind blew a hurricane this morning between two and three o'clock, the sea being very high. About four o'clock the brigantine Tenterden, Mr M'Kay, master, bound from Dundee to Sunderland, was running for the Tyne for shelter, when she missed the harbour mouth, and ran behind the south pier. Immediately upon this being observed, guns were fired and rockets were sent by the Coastguard to warn the life brigades that a vessel was ashore; and the Tynemouth, South Shields, and Cullercoats Life Brigades mustered with great expedition their rendezvous. The South Shields Life Brigade got the apparatus out, and in a short time they had a line fixed across the vessel. Having connected the ship with the shore by means of a hawser, a cradle was sent off, and the crew (five in number), with the master's wife and child, were safely brought ashore. This is the first time that a volunteer corps has had the opportunity of rescuing shipwrecked crew, and South Shields therefore carries off the laurel.

Described as the first use of the apparatus, a re-enactment took place 150 years later.

Eventually the Manby mortar was replaced by rockets to shoot lines to ships in distress. In 1967 a documentary on the inventor George Manby was made. Locations included Denver, Downham Market and Great Yarmouth. Scenes include the use of the mortar, rocket and breeches buoy. The recording is now available on the East Anglian Film Archive website.

== Competition ==
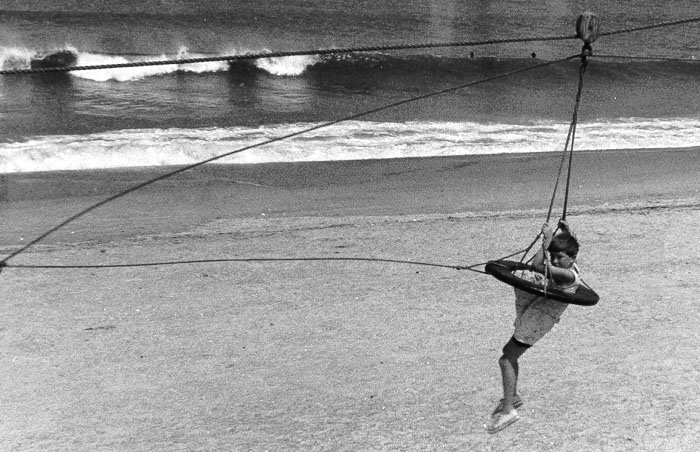
A child riding a breeches buoy

In Sea Scouts, use of a breeches buoy has become one of the events that are competed in at regattas such as the Old Salts' Regatta and the Ancient Mariner Sea Scout Regatta. The competition simulates an actual breeches buoy rescue situation.

Before the event the crew sets up their equipment, which includes a thin shot line attached to the tower simulating the crow's nest of a sinking ship, a high line made of a hawser, a block and tackle, a deadman with a cleat, an endless whip with a block, a chair, and shear legs. Once the equipment is prepared, two scouts go up to the tower (these scouts must wear harnesses for safety in most of today's competitions). The coxswain calls the four or five scouts remaining on the ground to attention.

No further talking is allowed by anyone except for the coxswain and the two participants in the tower. No communication other than yes and no arm signaling is allowed between the tower and ground. At the go signal, time begins and does not stop until the participant who is being rescued from the tower is on the ground and the coxswain calls the crew to attention again.

One member of the ground crew ties the whip block tail to the shot line. The coxswain signals the tower, and the tower returns the affirmative signal. The tower then hauls the whip up to them on the shot line, and ties the whip block tail to the mast with a round turn and two half hitches. The tower signals to the coxswain who returns the signal. The ground crew attaches the high line through the chair to the endless whip and raises the high line to the tower. Once the high line reaches the tower, it is attached to the mast with a round turn and two half hitches and a signal is passed to the coxswain.

The ground crew ties a bowline on a bight into the high line and hooks it to the blocks. The crew hauls on the blocks tightening the high line and secures it to the deadman with a cleat hitch. The shear legs are put in place. The chair is attached to the endless whip and raised to the tower. When everything on the ground is set, the coxswain signals the tower. One member of the tower crew gets in the chair and sits down, clips in, and signals the ground crew. The rider must be stopped in a controlled manner and removed from the chair. Time stops when the ground crew is called to attention by the coxswain.

Judges are responsible for halting progress if they deem a situation unsafe, and for correcting the situation as well as assessing penalties for violations such as talking and crossing the water line.

== See also ==
- Bosun's chair – Seat used to suspend a person working at height
- Henry Trengrouse – British inventor
- HMS Anson (1781)
- Lyle gun – Line-throwing gun for rescue
- Manby mortar – 19th-century sea rescue device
- Niagara Scow – Shipwreck upstream of Niagara Falls
- Volunteer Life Brigade – British sea rescue organisation
