= Galloper gun =

- Type: artillery piece
- Place of origin: United States of America

Service history
- In service: 1740

Specifications
- Mass: 600 lb (270 kg)

The Galloper gun is an artillery piece used circa 1740 in British colonies (later the United States). It has 1½, 2, 3, 4, and 6 (rare) pound shell variants. The gun and carriage weighs around 600 lb (270 kg). The gun was designed to be pulled by one horse between the shafts and to keep up with fast moving troops, perhaps even cavalry.

Gallopers were among the first attempts to give some degree of mobility to guns but the logistics of gun crew movement and ammunition transportation meant that the time to fire from a different location was not significantly reduced.

== In North America ==
The galloper carriage was not used in the Americas during the French and Indian War nor in the Revolutionary War. Smith's Universal Military Dictionary of 1779 states its use by the King of Prussia in the previous war. The replacements for the North American campaign were the Townsend design 3-pounder and the Patterson design 3-pounder on grasshopper carriages and the Congreve designed light field 3-pounder shipped in 1776. Several of these were taken from Burgoyne at Saratoga. Two original Townsends are found at the Smithsonian and West Point. The only Pattison original is in Perth, Canada. No original carriages exist but a gunner's model of the grasshopper carriage is found at the Woolwich military museum. Many of the Congreve light 3-pounders on butterfly carriages, two boxes mounted on the axle and one box in the trail, can be found in National Park facilities. Information on the cannons of the Verbreuggens at the Royal Brass Foundry is found in the book on 18th century gun founding by Carel de Beers.
