= Nine Maidens Downs =

Moorland in Cornwall, England

Coordinates: 50.184°N 5.253°W

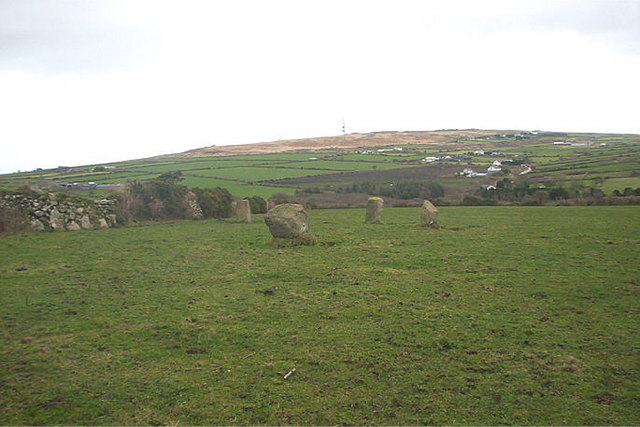
The Nine Maidens Stone Circle.

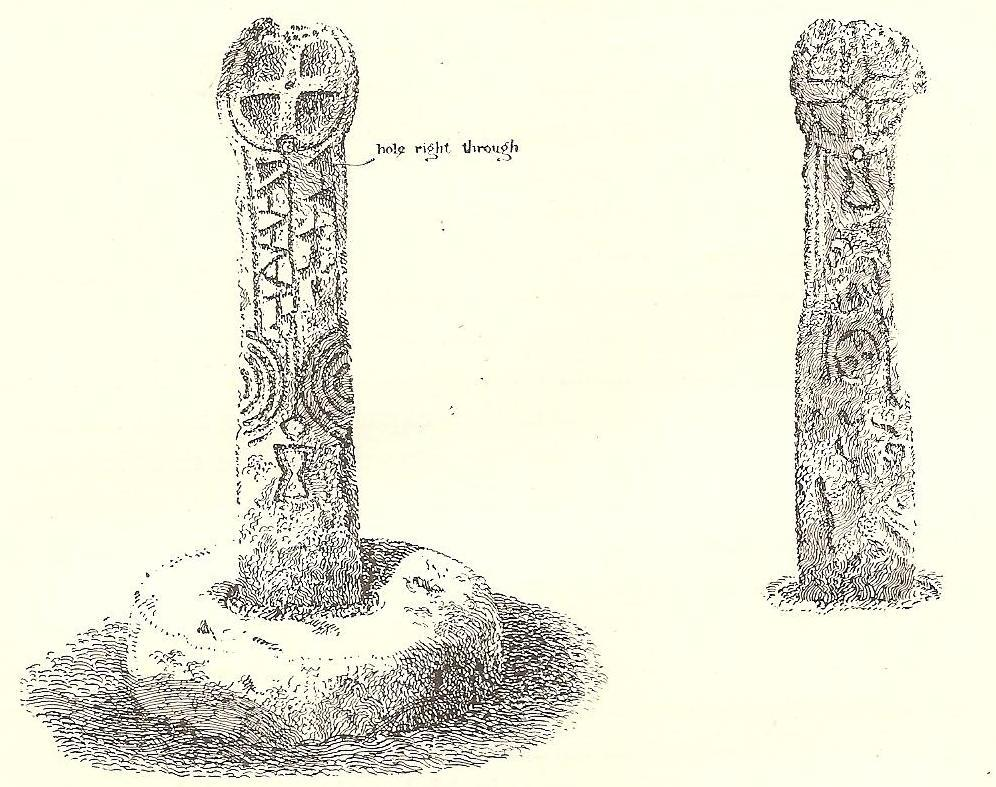
This cross once stood at the north of Nine Maidens Downs and marked the boundary between Camborne, Crowan, Wendron and Illogan parishes. It now stands in the grounds of Clowance house. The crossroads was known as Binnerton Cross; the head has a Greek cross on one side and a crude figure of Christ on the other.

Nine Maidens Downs is a moorland southwest of Four Lanes in Cornwall, England, UK.

== Stone circles ==
The name Nine Maidens comes from two Early Bronze Age stone circles which stood 18m apart on the downs. There was a belief that the stones were originally young women turned to stone for dancing on the Sabbath.

Originally the south-east circle was 16m across with 14 or 15 stones. Half of this circle survives with a semicircle of five stones, four of which are free standing and the other is built into the Cornish hedge in its original position. At least one other stone still exists but was moved to build the hedge.

The north-west circle had a diameter of about 21m. Two of its stones remain in the hedge but may not be in their original positions. William Borlase noted 10 stones of this circle remaining circa 1760.

== Hangman's Barrow ==
Half a mile west of the stone circles, on a prominent ridge, is the massive Bronze Age cairn of Hangman's Barrow. The cairn, built entirely of stone, is 3m high and 20m in diameter. The centre has suffered from past tomb robbing attempts and nothing is known of its original contents.

== River Cober ==
Nine Maidens is the source of the river Cober which rises between Hangman's Barrow to the west and the Nine Maidens stone circles to the east and runs to the west of the town of Helston before entering the largest natural lake in Cornwall – Loe Pool.

== School ==
Nine Maidens Board school was erected in 1878 at the northern end of the downs.
