= Treloar =

Treloar is a Cornish surname, now most common in Australia and North America.

== Etymology ==
Treloar is a habitational surname originating from Wendron, Cornwall, England. It means "homestead with garden", taken from Cornish tre homestead and lowarth garden. The 'w' was later dropped and subsequently, the 'th'.

== People with the surname Treloar ==
- Adam Treloar (born 1993), Australian rules football player
- Cameron Treloar (born 1980), Australian rugby union player for Union Bordeaux Bègles in the Top 14
- John Treloar (athlete) (born 1928), track and field athlete, one of Australia's greatest sprinters
- J. L. Treloar (1894–1952), Australian archivist and director of the Australian War Memorial
- L. R. G. Treloar (1906–1985), author and rubber engineer
- Lucy Treloar, Australian novelist
- Margaret Treloar, Canadian food scientist, chair of the World Association of Girl Guides and Girl Scouts
- Peter Treloar, Australian politician elected in 2010
- Phil Treloar (born 1946), Australian jazz drummer, percussionist and composer
- Thomas Treloar (1892–1953), Australian politician
- William M. Treloar (1850–1935), American music professor, composer, music publisher, and U.S. Representative from Missouri
- Sir William Treloar, 1st Baronet (1843–1923), manufacturer, philanthropist and Lord Mayor of the City of London

== See also ==
- Treloar, Missouri, unincorporated community in southern Warren County, Missouri, United States
- Treloar College, secondary school and sixth-form college for physically disabled students in Alton, Hampshire, England
- Treloar Copyright Bill, revision of the United States copyright laws introduced February 13, 1896
- Treloar School, non-maintained special school for disabled children in Alton, Hampshire, UK
- Treloar's Hospital Platform railway station
