= Museum of Cornish Life =

Museum in Cornwall, England

Coordinates: 50.107°N 5.272°W

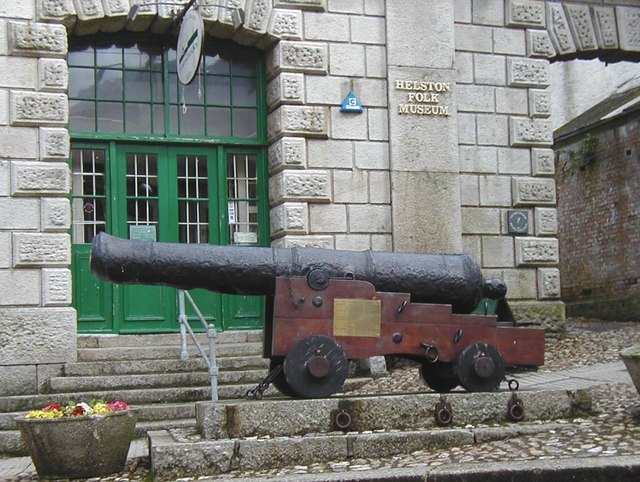
The cannon by the entrance

Museum of Cornish Life (formerly Helston Museum) is a museum situated in the former market town of Helston, Cornwall, England, United Kingdom. It is located immediately behind Helston Guildhall.

The building was originally designed as the town's Market House in 1837.

The 4th Battalion, Duke of Cornwall's Light Infantry (D Company) used the complex as its drill hall during the First World War.

The museum was founded in the market hall in 1949. It expanded into the meat market in the early 1980s and into the adjoining Drill Hall in 1999.

In front of the building is a cannon salvaged from the wreck of the frigate HMS Anson which foundered off Loe Bar on 29 December 1807.

The Museum's collection reflects both the social and industrial history of The Lizard Peninsula, from mining, fishing and farming through to home life in the 18th - 20th centuries.

Previously run by Cornwall Council, management of the museum was taken over by the South Kerrier Heritage Trust in August 2013. The Trust is a local registered charity working with the community, and day-to-day work at the museum is largely undertaken by volunteers.

== See also ==
- Culture of Cornwall
