= Sir William Treloar, 1st Baronet =

English businessman (1843–1923)

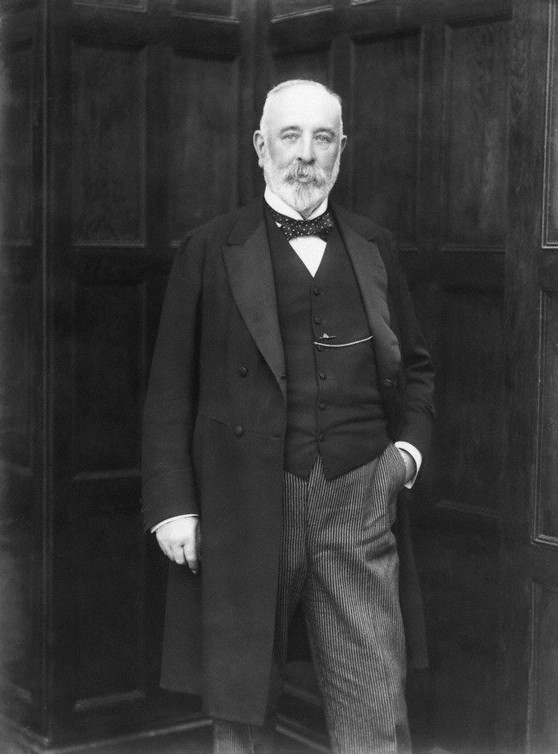
Treolar in 1922

Sir William Purdie Treloar, 1st Baronet (13 January 1843 – 6 September 1923) was an English businessman who was Sheriff of London in 1889–1900 and Lord Mayor of London in 1906–1907. He established an active "Cripples' Fund" as his mayoral appeal.

== Career ==
Treloar was born in London, and educated at King's College School. He was head of the firm of Treloar and Sons (haberdashery), and Director and Trustee of T. Cook and Son. He was selected an Alderman of the City of London for the Ward of Farringdon Without from 1892, a Sheriff of the City of London in 1899 and Lord Mayor of the City of London in 1906–1907.

On St Thomas's Day, 21 December 1881, he became a Common Councilman for the Ward of Farringdon Without. He served as a Common Councilman until he became its Alderman in 1892.

He was the author of A Lord Mayor's Diary 1906-7 (1920) and of the earlier works Ludgate Hill: Past and Present (1881, 2nd ed 1892), Prince of Palms (1884), With the Kaiser in the East, 1898 (1915) and Wilkes and the City (1917).

== Lord Mayor of London ==
Sir William Treloar established a "Cripples' Fund" as his mayoral appeal, for which he gained 10,000 pounds of donations for his Alton Hospital during his tenure as Lord Mayor of London 9 November 1906 to 1907. Sir William and Lady Treloar greeted their first patients at Alton railway station on 8 September 1908 and a new branch was opened at Sandy Point, Hayling Island, in September 1919, with 50 patients.

As a result of this in 1908 he opened Treloar College and Treloar School, near Alton, Hampshire, which has become part of the Treloar Trust a charity supporting the UK's leading specialist centre providing education, independence training and opportunities for young people with physical disabilities.

Treloar maintains its links with The City and Livery Companies: each Lord Mayor of the City of London automatically becomes a trustee of Treloar Trust and visits the college and school.

During his period of office as Lord Mayor he made a ceremonial visit to Cornwall, the county from which his ancestors came. He received the Freedom of Helston at Helston Guildhall and had the honour of leading the full dress Furry Dance at noon on 8 May 1907.

== Honours ==
Escutcheon of the Treloar baronets of Grange Mount

He was knighted by Queen Victoria in his year as sheriff, at Windsor Castle on 29 March 1900. On 8 May 1907 he was in Helston, Cornwall "the home of my fathers" and was given the Freedom of the Borough of Helston and then Freedom of the Borough of Truro. On 8 July 1907, Treloar conducted the opening of Simmons Park in Okehampton, Devon. After this date, a Swiss-style chalet – named Chalet Treloar – was built by the riverside in his honour. On 17 July 1907 he was created a baronet, of Grange Mount in the Parish of All Saints, Upper Norwood, in the Borough of Croydon.

Sir William died at his home Grange Mount, in Upper Norwood on 6 September 1923 aged 80 and was buried alongside his wife at Shirley, Surrey.

Civic offices
Preceded by Walter Morgan	Lord Mayor of London; 1906–1907	Succeeded by John Charles Bell
Baronetage of the United Kingdom
New creation	Baronet (of Grange Mount); 1907–1923	Extinct
Preceded by Scotter baronets	Treolar baronets of Grange Mount; 17 July 1907	Succeeded by Holland baronets
