= W. H. Cock =

English clergyman and writer

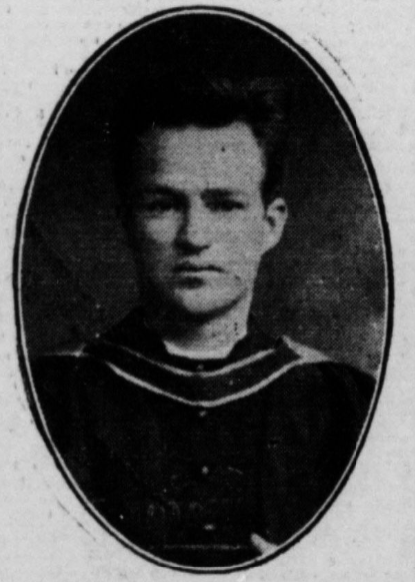
- Born: William Hendy Cock; 19 February 1873; Helston
- Died: 2 February 1938 (aged 64); Weston-super-Mare
- Occupation: Clergyman
- Spouse: Mary Isabel Baines (m. 1912)

William Hendy Cock (19 February 1873 – 2 February 1938) was an English clergyman, novelist and writer. He argued for humane treatment of animals and authored a book defending a future life for animals from a Christian evolutionary perspective.

== Biography ==
Cock was born in Helston and obtained a B.Sc from the University of London in 1902. He held certificates in chemistry, mathematics and physics. He took honours in geology and in 1900 became a Fellow of the Geological Society of London. He was ordained as a Deacon to Exeter Cathedral in 1904. Cock was assistant chaplain of St. Luke's College from 1904 to 1911, chaplain of Exeter City Workhouse from 1907 to 1911 and curate of St Matthew's Church, Exeter from 1910 to 1911. He was vice-principal of Warrington Training College from 1911 to 1916.

He was a chaplain to the Sheriff of Exeter and was a Diocesan Inspector in Lancashire. He was Diocesan Inspector and late Principal of the Manchester, Chester and Liverpool Diocesan Training College for Schoolmistresses. He was also Director of Religious Education for the Diocese of York from 1920 to 1926.

Cock wrote novels under the pseudonym William Le Pretre. His dystopian novel The Bolshevik in 1931 featured a Bolshevik uprising that seized control of France and the United Kingdom. His last novel was John Noalex, Priest. He moved to Weston-super-Mare and retired in 1926.

== Views ==
=== Animal welfare ===
Cock was an advocate of animal welfare and was a supporter of the RSPCA. His 1916 book Love and Cruelty argued for humane treatment of animals. A reviewer commented that "no one can read the book thoughtfully without feeling that we owe a great deal more than we usually show to animals". In 1937, he returned to the topic in his book Animals and a Future Life which defended animal intelligence and the existence of a future life for animals based on a Christian evolutionary perspective. He stated that "animals not only exhibit intelligence and skill, but many other human characteristics... They display individuality, ingenuity, imagination, and self-control; show fidelity, sympathy and gratitude; exhibit curiosity, suspicion, pride, disgust and jealousy; seek pleasure and try to avoid pain". His thesis was that as animals are personal beings that possess a mind there is no major observable difference between the highest animals and primitive man than there is between primitive man and the highly developed man.

=== Spiritualism ===
In 1915, Cock authored Life in the Physical and Spiritual Worlds which combined psychical and spiritualist phenomena within a Christian resurrection framework. Cock examined first-hand reports and records from the Society for Psychical Research.

== Personal life ==
Cock married Mary Isabel Baines in 1912. He died suddenly from a heart attack in Weston-super-Mare in 1938, aged 64. An obituary described him as a "prolific author, having published many theological works as well as in later years, a succession of novels with a religious theme". He left £3895 in his will.

== Selected publications ==
- The Mystery of Pain. Western Times. 1908.
- Life in the Physical and Spiritual Worlds. The Century Press. 1915.
- Thoughts on the Seven Words from the Cross. Robert Scott. 1916.
- Love and Cruelty. Robert Scott. 1916.
- Animals and a Future Life. Mortiboy's. 1937.
- Creation and Redemption. Skeffington. 1932.
