= John Bryant Lane =

Cornish painter (1788–1868)

John Bryant Lane (1788 – 1868) was a Cornish painter.

== Biography ==
Lane was born at Helston in Cornwall in 1788, the son of Samuel Lane, chemist and excise-man, and Margaret Baldwin his wife. He was educated at Truro until he was fourteen when his taste for art was noticed by Francis Basset, 1st Baron de Dunstanville and Basset of Tehidy, who gave him the means to practise it in London. Lane was bestowed a gold medal from the Society of Arts for an historical cartoon of The Angels Unbound.

In 1808, Lane exhibited at the Royal Academy an altarpiece for Lord de Dunstanville's church in Cornwall; in 1811 he produced Christ mocked by Pilate's Soldiers for Helston Guildhall, and in 1817 produced Eutychus for a church in London.

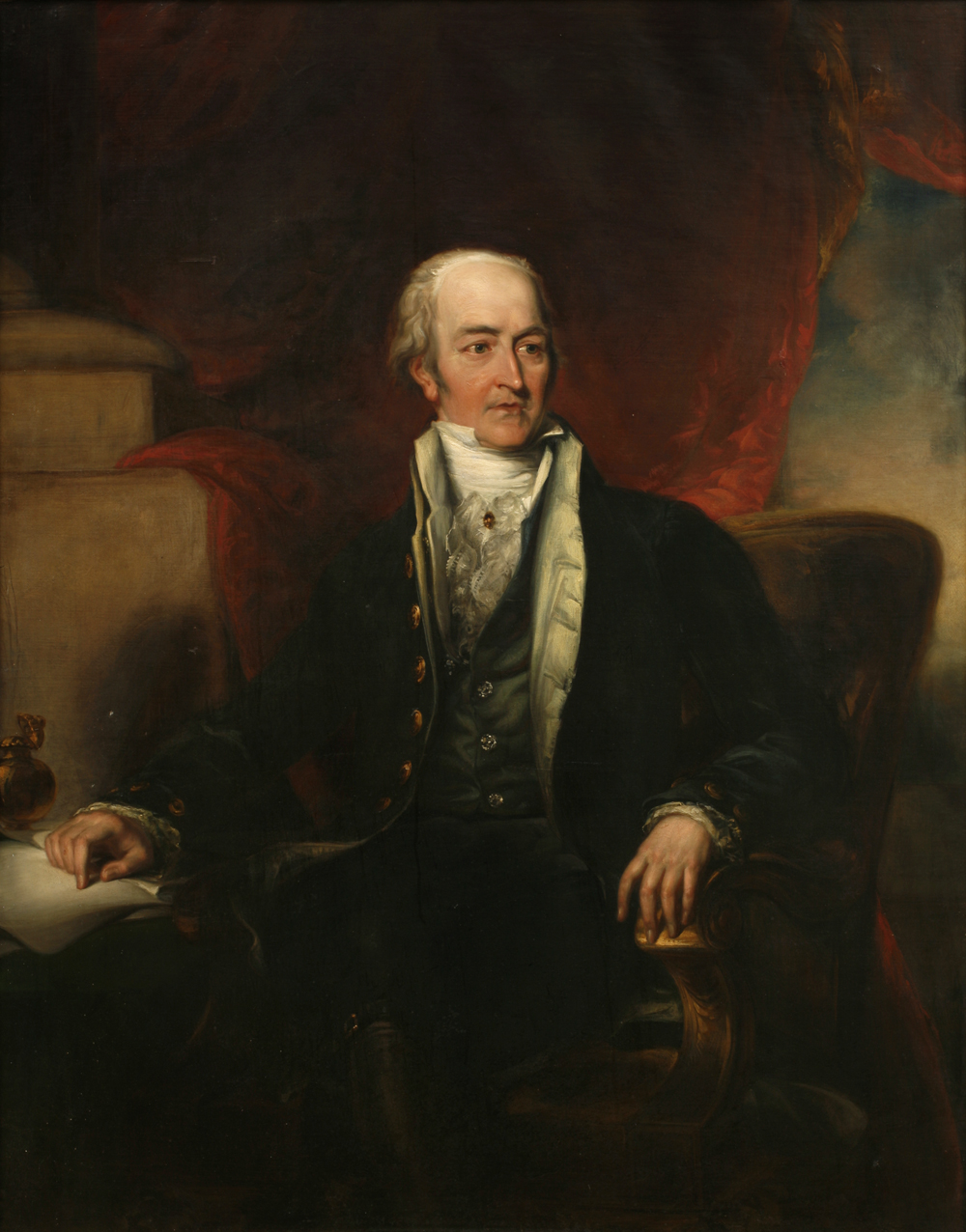
Portrait of Lord de Dunstanville, his patron, by John Bryant Lane

In 1817, his patron sent Lane to Rome, where he remained for ten years, engaged on a gigantic picture, The Vision of Joseph, which he refused to show during progress. At last he completed it, and exhibited it at Rome. As it was offensive to the papal authorities, they expelled the artist and his picture from the papal dominions.

Lane then sent the picture to London, where he exhibited it in a room at the royal mews, Charing Cross. Its huge size attracted attention, but from an artistic point of view it was a failure. It was deposited in the Pantechnicon, where it mouldered to decay. Lane subsequently devoted himself to portrait-painting, and sent portraits occasionally to the Royal Academy. Among his sitters were Hussey Vivian, Davies Gilbert, Charles Valentine Le Grice, and Lord de Dunstanville. Lane died, unmarried, at 45 Clarendon Square, Somers Town, London, on 4 April 1868, aged 80.
