= River Cober =

River in United Kingdom

Coordinates: 50°05′N 5°17′W

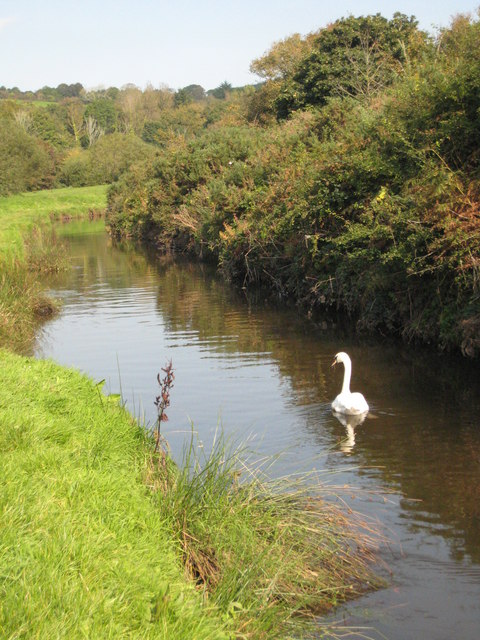
- The Cober near Helston
- Native name: Dowr Kohar (Cornish)

Location
- Country: United Kingdom
- Region: Cornwall

Physical characteristics
- Source
  - location: Nine Maidens Downs
- Mouth: Loe Pool
  - location: Mount's Bay

The River Cober (Cornish: Dowr Kohar) is a short river in west Cornwall, England, United Kingdom. The river runs to the west of Helston into The Loe, Cornwall's largest natural lake.

== Geology and hydrology ==
It rises in Nine Maidens Downs, directly between Hangman's Barrow to the west and the Nine Maidens stone circle to the east, in the former Kerrier District and runs to the west of the town of Helston before entering the largest natural lake in Cornwall – Loe Pool. The water is impounded by the natural barrier, Loe Bar, and the river system can be traced several kilometres out into Mount's Bay. Mining activity of over one hundred years in the river catchment, ceased in 1938, in the Wendron and Porkellis mining districts; and the engine house of Castle Wary (also known as Wheal Pool), near Nansloe can still be seen on the east side of the river below Helston. The lower reaches of the river were canalised in 1946 and a causeway was built over Loe Marsh in 1987. The meaning of the name is uncertain, but two of the earliest records are: "in 1260 we find, 'Chohor' [alternately known as in non-unified Cornish: Dowr Coghar, meaning 'scarlet river'], due to its earlier colour from mining waste and a few years later, 'Coffar'". The present name 'Cober' is unlikely to be derived from 'Coffar', since it was known as the 'River Loe or River Looe' around four hundred years ago, in Carew's time, according to the map of Powder Hundred.

== History ==
A common belief is that until the 13th century the River Cober ran directly to sea, until its mouth became blocked by a deposition of sand which formed Loe Bar and created Loe Pool. Loe Bar was most likely created by eustatic sea level rise after the last ice age. The rising sea level pushed a large amount of sediment into the mouth of the river, blocking it and creating a barrier beach. Loe Bar consists mainly of flint, a rock not found in Cornwall; the nearest onshore source is in east Devon, 120 miles (190 km) away. The most likely source of flint is found offshore; the drowned terraces of a former river that flowed between England and France and is now under the English Channel.

In the 1870s, a total of £3000 was spent by the ″Porkellis-moor-adventure″ on the exploration of china clay deposits on Porkellis Moor. A bakehouse-flue and large tanks were built, but in 1879 the adventurers sold by auction their holdings and by 1884 the works were derelict.

The Helston branch railway (which closed in 1962) ran along part of the valley into Helston. The Railway line crosses the main River on the 5-arch Cober Viaduct.
