= Rosaleen Moriarty-Simmonds =

British businesswoman, artist and disability rights campaigner (born 1960)

Rosaleen Moriarty-Simmonds OBE
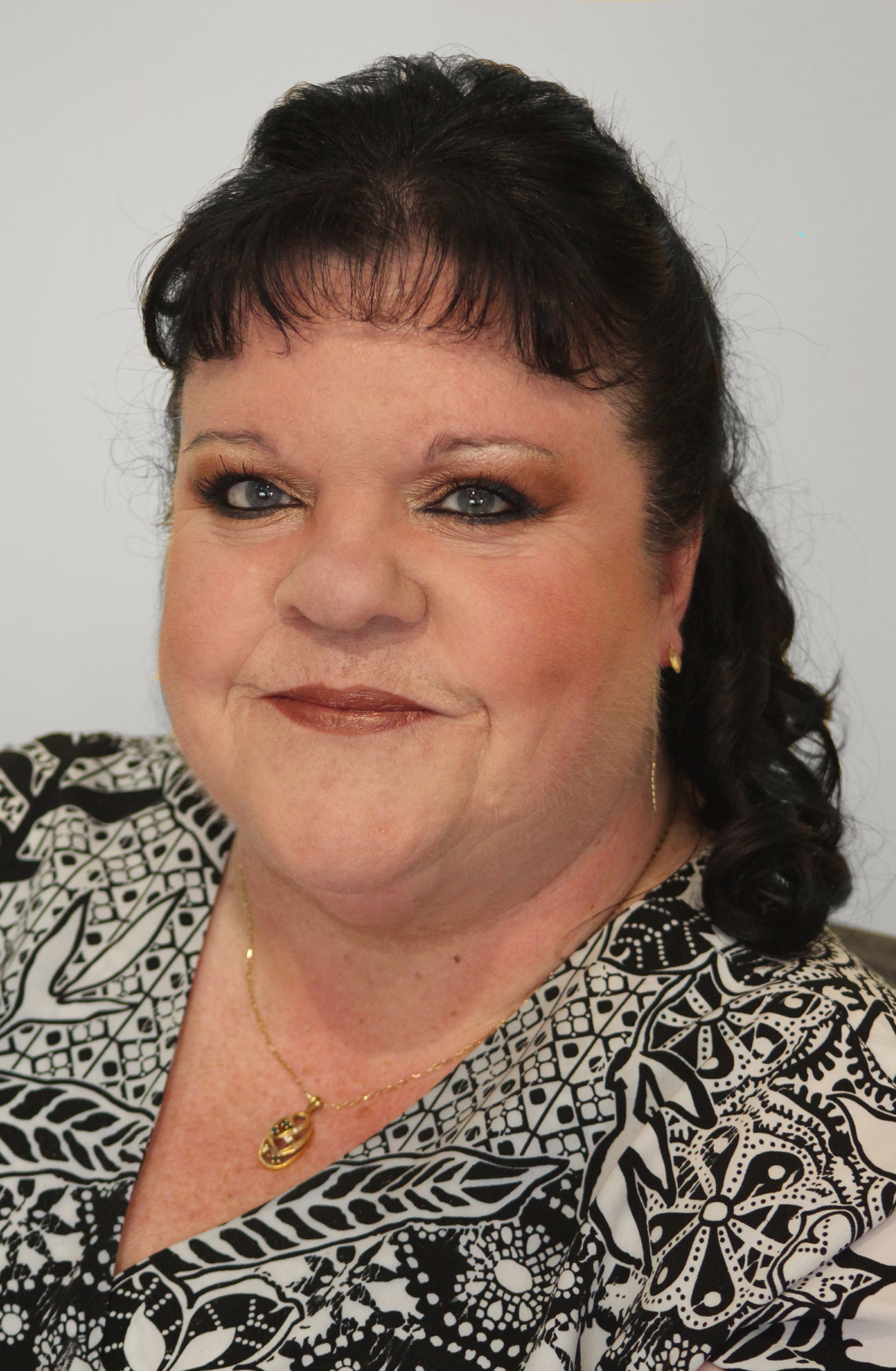
- Born: 1960 (age 65–66); Cardiff, Wales
- Education: Treloar School
- Alma mater: Cardiff University
- Occupations: Businesswoman, artist, author, disability rights campaigner
- Known for: Disability rights advocacy; Thalidomide Memorial campaign
- Awards: Officer of the Order of the British Empire (2015)

Rosaleen (Rosie) Moriarty-Simmonds OBE (born 1960) is a British businesswoman, artist, author, and disability rights campaigner. She was born without arms or legs as a result of her mother's thalidomide prescription. She is known for her advocacy work on behalf of disabled people, her role in establishing the Thalidomide Memorial in Cardiff, and her work in business, media, and the arts. She was appointed an Officer of the Order of the British Empire (OBE) in 2015 for services to equality and disability rights.

== Early life and education ==
Rosaleen Moriarty-Simmonds was born in Cardiff, Wales, in 1960. She was born without arms or legs as a result of her mother being prescribed thalidomide during pregnancy.

Moriarty-Simmonds attended Ysgol Erw'r Delyn, a special school in Penarth that opened in 1958. At the age of 14, Moriarty-Simmonds continued her education at Treloar School in Alton, Hampshire. At this time, it was the only school in the UK that provided an academic education to people with disabilities such as hers. She attended Cardiff University from 1985 as its first known disabled student.

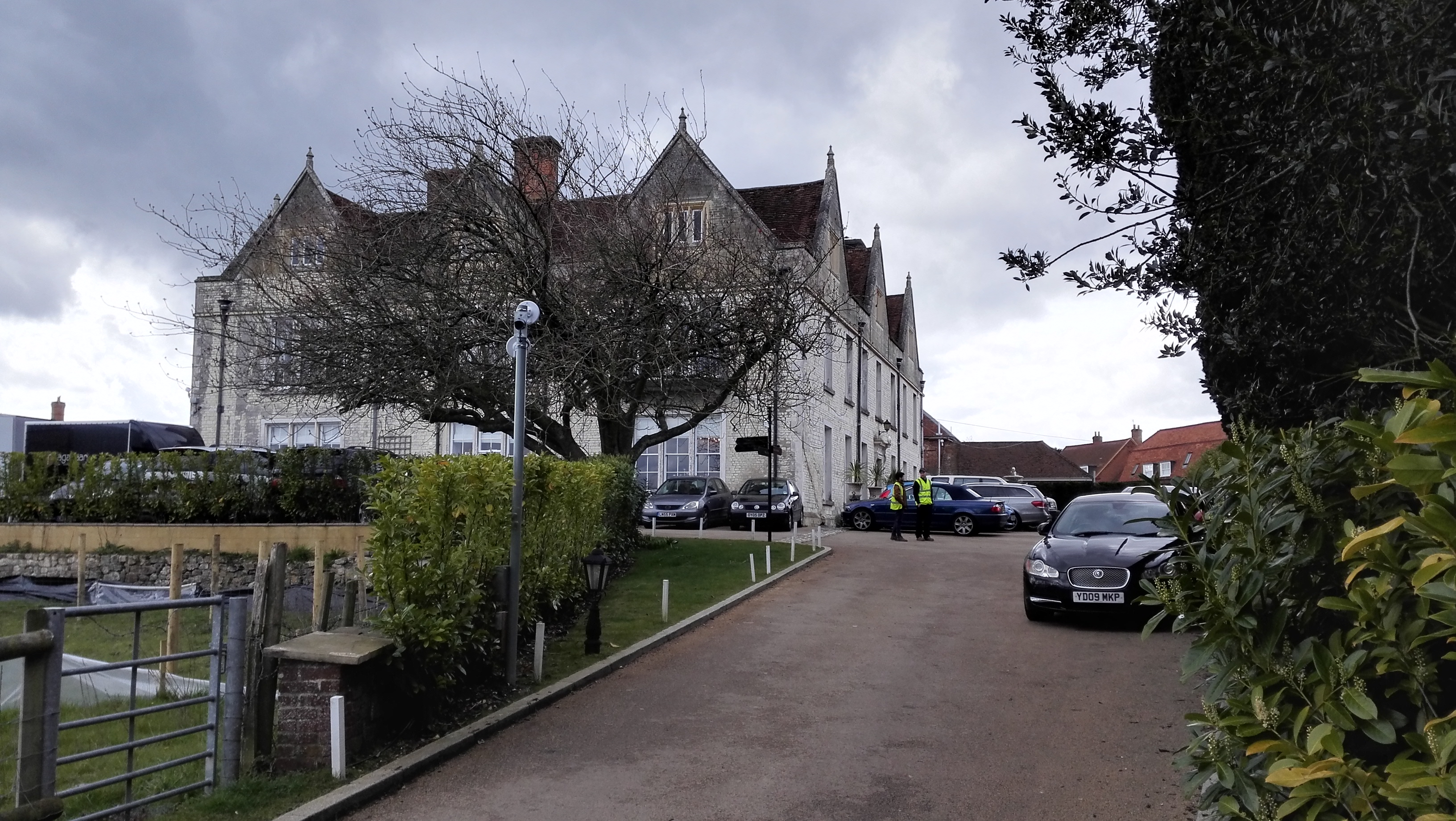
Old Treloar School

== Career and accomplishments ==
Moriarty-Simmonds began her career after graduating in 1985. As a disabled woman during the mid-to-late 20th century, she faced discrimination on a daily basis, making it difficult to get hired. Many companies expressed concerns that her disability would affect her strength and productivity as a worker. In an interview for UK Disability History Month, she said she applied for over 400 jobs and was granted interviews for only four of them.

=== Business ===
Moriarty-Simmonds was eventually able to secure a position as a civil servant and began working at Companies House, an executive agency of the British government. She worked specifically in the Department of Trade and Industry. After several years in one position there, she rose to the executive officer level, where she remained until she stepped down in 1993. In 1995, after seven years working at Companies House, Moriarty-Simmonds established RMS, her own consulting agency, which specialised in advising on disability law and offered training to various organisations on a range of disability issues. She operated her consultancy firm from home, providing expert advice on disability law to the local government, National Assembly, Cardiff Council, and a range of other organisations.

=== Arts and media ===
In 1999, Moriarty-Simmonds joined the Mouth and Foot Painting Artists Association (MFPA). She began creating original paintings by holding a paintbrush in her mouth. Since then, seven pieces of her artwork have been featured on cards and gift wrapping sold in 14 different countries worldwide.

Moriarty-Simmonds has also worked in television and theatre. She appeared in the TV series Define Normal in 2005, later presenting the BBC Wales programme Rosie's World and performing in the one-act play The Cardiff Tapes.

In 2007, Moriarty-Simmonds published her autobiography, Four Fingers and Thirteen Toes, in which she reflects on her life as a thalidomide survivor. Her book discusses her personal struggles as a disabled person, her experiences with discrimination while growing up with a disability, and the historical context of the Thalidomide tragedy.

=== Awards and honours ===
In 2011, Moriarty-Simmonds was the first of two recipients to receive the Owain Glyndwr Seren award from Cardiff Council, presented to her for dedicating her life to working with disabled people. In 2013, she was appointed vice president of the Cardiff Business Club, an organisation that convenes public speakers of international standing, bringing them together with audiences from around the world. In 2015, she was appointed an Officer of the Order of the British Empire in the Queen's New Year Honours List for "Services to the Equality and Rights of Disabled People." She has been awarded two honorary fellowships and a doctorate, one fellowship from Cardiff University in 2017 and r fellowship and doctorate from Swansea University. In 2022, she was appointed High Sheriff of South Glamorgan, an independent, voluntary royal appointment that lasts one year and typically involves ceremonial duties, judicial functions, and community-based charitable and civic work.

== Activism ==
=== Impact on the thalidomide-impaired community ===
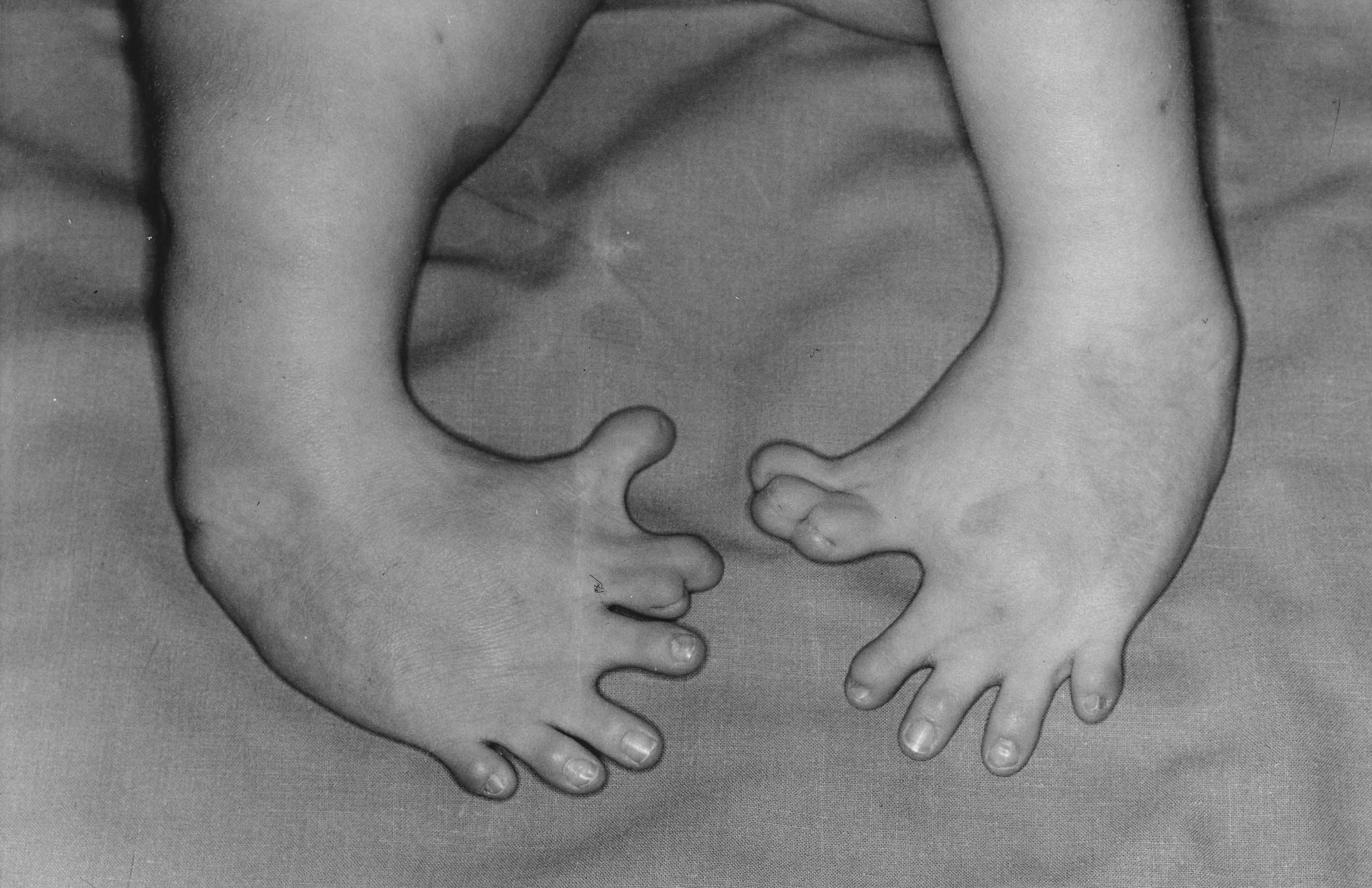
Malformation of the feet caused by thalidomide

Moriarty-Simmonds has educated people about thalidomide impairment through various means. One way she has spread awareness about thalidomide impairment is through the TV drama Call the Midwife.

Season 5, Episode 1 of Call the Midwife, in which a thalidomide baby was born, was partially inspired by Moriarty-Simmonds's story. The producers of the show used Moriarty-Simmonds's autobiography to make it as accurate and educational as possible. In the 2017 documentary Call the Midwife: The Casebook, Moriarty-Simmonds appears as herself and talks about her own life, her experiences of being thalidomide impaired, and how they relate to the character Susie in the show.

Moriarty-Simmonds campaigned for financial compensation for people affected by the thalidomide epidemic. She advocates for funding for thalidomide-impaired individuals, especially as they get older. While a funding agreement for the Thalidomide Trust Health Grant (TTHG) was due to end in 2023, Moriarty-Simmonds has argued that extending the grant would be helpful for the thalidomide-impaired community.

=== Thalidomide Memorial ===
The Thalidomide Memorial was created in 2016 to honour and remember those who have been affected by the thalidomide crisis. It is located in Alexandra Gardens, Cathays Park, Cardiff. The memorial is a headstone engraved with words honouring the children who died due to thalidomide, those who still live with thalidomide impairment today, and their families and supporters. On Art UK, Moriarty-Simmonds is listed as the commissioner of the piece and is seen in pictures on the Thalidomide Memorial website.

== Personal life ==
Moriarty-Simmonds lives with her husband, Stephen Simmonds, in South Wales. Stephen was also born with thalidomide impairments, in his case affecting his legs. Stephen and Rosaleen had been friends since childhood. In 1995, the couple had their first child, James.
