= Spike Breakwell =

British comedian

Spike Breakwell (born Colin James Breakwell on 13 June 1968) is a British comedian. When he was four months old he became disabled through taking oral polio vaccine which caused a two-week coma. He was brought up in Dunstable, and "treated and raised to be as stubborn and independent as anyone else round about." As a child, he attended Lady Zia Wernher School in Luton, then moved to Lord Mayor Treloar College in Alton, Hampshire for his secondary education.

Breakwell was the first wheelchair-using comedian on the London alternative club circuit from 1992, appearing on stage and BBC2 television. His act always started with the line: "...I don't know what I've been drinking but I could walk half an hour ago!". He also co-wrote and co-starred (with Simon Hardeman) in the Edinburgh International Festival Fringe shows On The Toilet With Shergar (An Evening of Horseplay and Lavatory Humour ) in 1992, Simon and Spikes Laugh-In in 1993 and the critically acclaimed play looking at comedy Death of a Comedian in 1994.

He co-wrote (with Simon Hardeman) the Beginners' Guide column in The Times Magazine. He has also been a regular in a BBC disability magazine programme. In January 2006 Breakwell and part of the Wheelabout expedition team drove across Australia. He had planned to become the first person to cross from Perth to Sydney (4600 miles) in an electric wheelchair. However, funding for the trip failed to materialise and it is yet to be completed.

In October 2007 he appeared in his first Hollywood film, Dante's Criterion, described as a supernatural horror story of a possessed television, as "Ziggy Fontain" a wheelchair-using TV advertising producer.

== Books ==
- 2017 Leila's Game 1 Pathfinders by Spike Breakwell and Colin Millar
- 2017 Movie World 4 Voyagers by Spike Breakwell and Colin Millar
- 2021 Isolation Nation by Spike Breakwell
