= Mount's Bay =

Bay on the south coast of Cornwall, England

Coordinates: 50.0580°N 5.4204°W

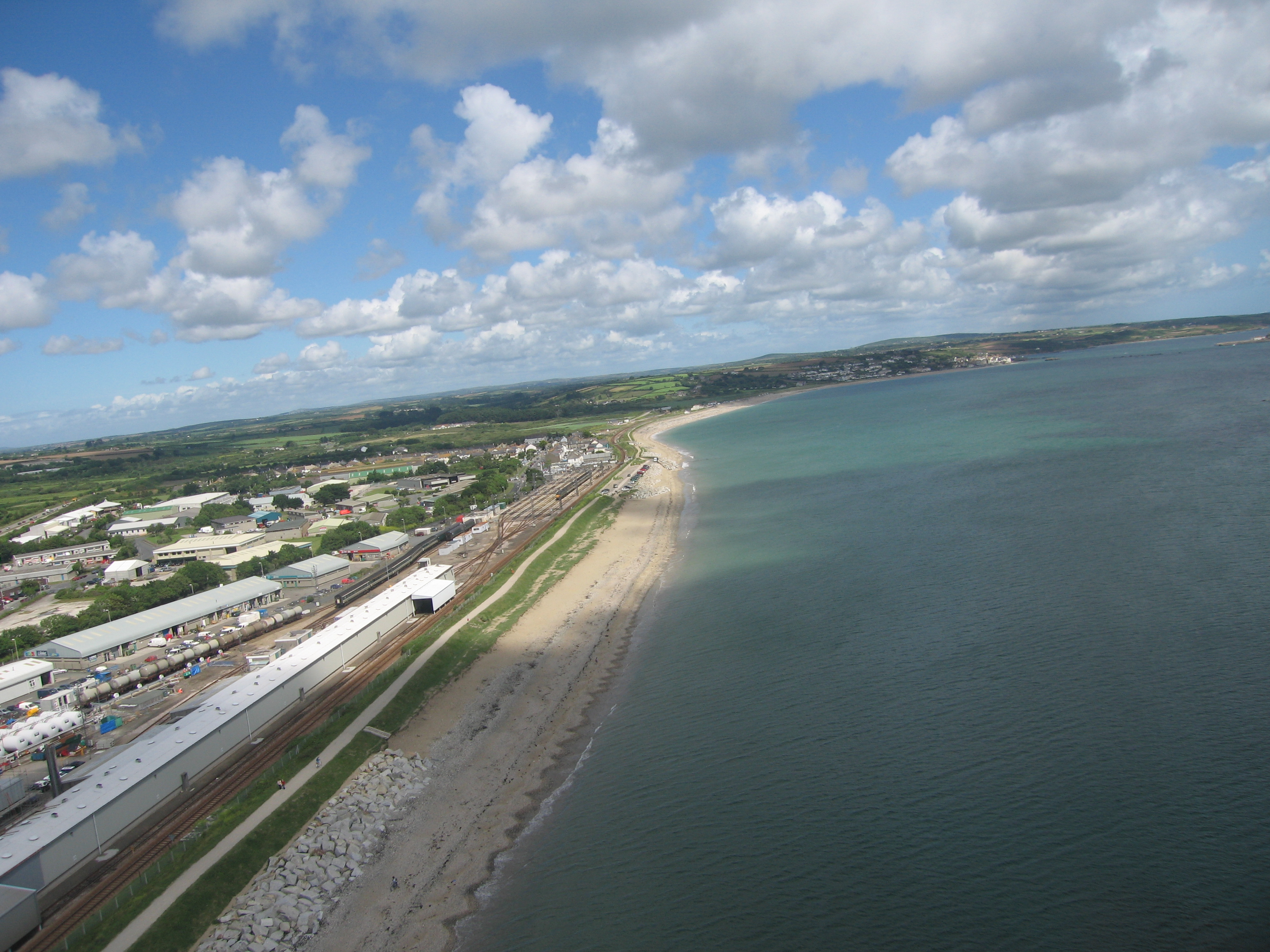
Mount's Bay from a helicopter

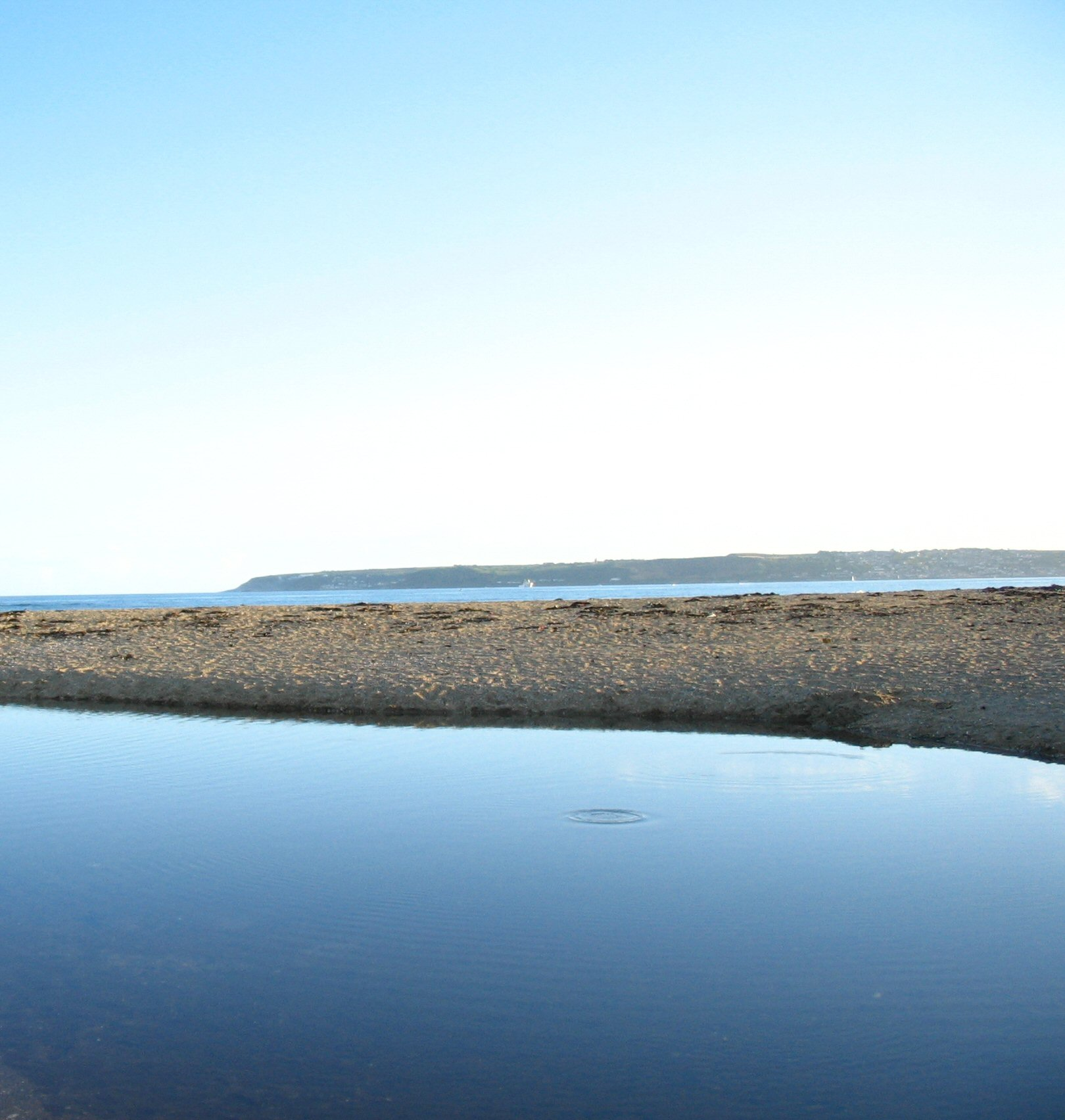
Mount's Bay

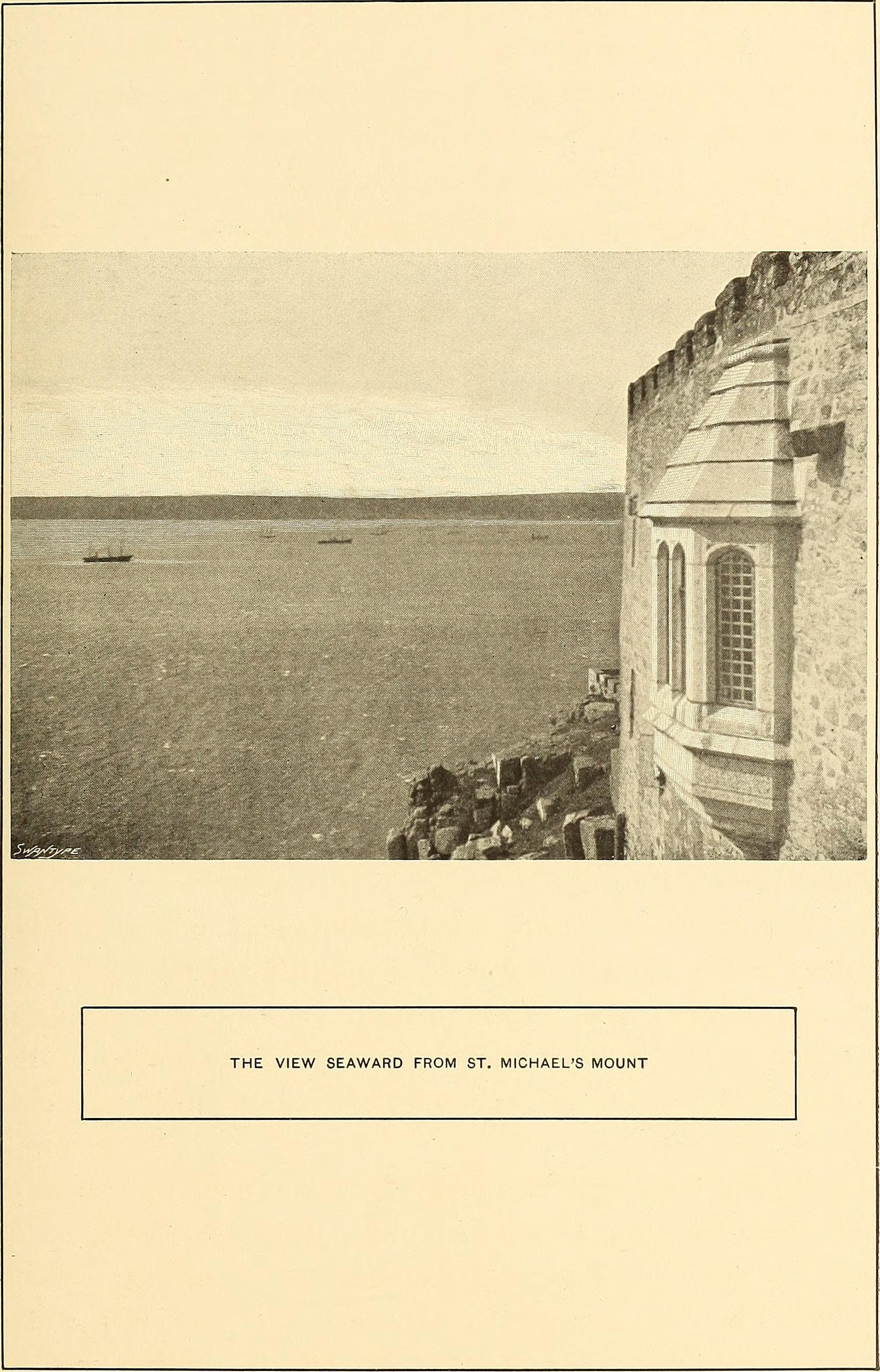
A seaward view from St Michael's Mount (1902)

Mount's Bay (Cornish: Baya an Garrek) is a bay on the English Channel coast of Cornwall, England, stretching from the Lizard Point to Gwennap Head. In the north of the bay, near Marazion, is St Michael's Mount, the origin of name of the bay. In summer, it is a generally benign natural harbour. However, in winter, onshore gales present maritime risks, particularly for sailing ships. There are more than 150 known wrecks from the nineteenth century in the area. The eastern side of the bay centred around Marazion and St Michael's Mount was designated as a Marine Conservation Zone in January 2016.

== Geography and geology ==
Mount's Bay is the biggest bay in Cornwall. Its half-moon shape is similar to that of Donegal Bay in Ireland and Cardigan Bay in Wales, although, unlike the aforementioned bays, Mount's Bay is relatively sheltered from the prevailing Atlantic westerlies. However, it is a danger to shipping during onshore southerly and south-easterly gales.

The coast is about 42 miles (68 km) from Lizard Point to Gwennap Head. Heading north and west from Lizard Point, the serpentine and hornblende schist cliffs reach a maximum height of 71 m (233 ft) at Vellan Head and are only broken by small streams and coves such as at Kynance, Gew-grade and Mullion Cove. After Gunwalloe Fishing Cove the cliffs have the softer look of Devonian Meneage Formations of greywacke and mélange, with erosion a problem either side of the naturally dammed ria of Loe Pool. West of Porthleven there are high Devonian slate and granite cliffs to Rinsey Head after which the cliffs are topped by Pleistocene periglacial head and have eroded to form sandy beaches such as those at Praa Sands and Kenneggy. These beaches are in deficit and the cliff line is retreating. With the exception of the harder Devonian dolerite and gabbro of Cudden Point, the low, eroding cliffs and beaches continue to Mousehole. This part of the bay is the most populated with the towns of Penzance and Marazion and the villages of Newlyn and Mousehole. Beyond Mousehole the granite cliffs, rise to 60 m, and are broken by small streams such as at Lamorna Cove and Penberth.

There are small sand dune systems at Church Cove and Poldhu Cove, Porthleven Sands, Praa Sands and from Marazion to Eastern Green, Penzance. The former sand dunes of the Western Green are now covered by Penzance promenade. All, but Marazion to Penzance, are examples of bay dune systems which develop where there is a limited supply of sand trapped within the shelter of two rocky headlands. Church and Poldhu Coves are SSSI and also have associated climbing dunes which occur when sand is blown inland of the main dune system.

Evidence of higher sea-levels in the past can be seen at Marazion where the town is built on a raised beach. A second example is the road between Newlyn and Mousehole. Sea levels rise and fall as the ice sheets advance and retreat, and raised beaches now mark the interglacial periods when sea levels were higher.

Gwavas Lake is an area of relatively calm water that is situated outside the current harbour area of Newlyn.

=== Post-ice age ===
Offshore surveys have found submerged erosional plains and valleys containing deposits of peat, sand and gravel. The deposits indicate cyclical changes from wetland, to coastal forest, to brackish conditions have been occurring over the past 12,000 years as sea levels rose. With the melting of ice-sheets and glaciers after the last ice age, sea levels reached their present levels about 6,000 years ago during what is known as the Flandrian Marine Trangression. Either side of Penzance, on the beaches at Ponsandane and Wherrytown, evidence of a 'submerged forest' can sometimes be seen at low tide in the form of several partially fossilised tree trunks. Divers and trawlers also find submerged tree trunks across Mount's Bay and the forest may have covered a coastal plain 2 to 5 kilometres further south than today. The samples of peat and wood around Penzance have been radiocarbon dated and indicate that the forest was growing from at least 6,000 to around 4,000 years ago when rising sea levels finally killed the trees. Artefacts dating from the Mesolithic (10,000 to 5,000 BCE) have been found indicating some occupation contemporary with the forest. Marshes formed and were overlain by sand, gravel and by sand dunes which formed natural barriers to the sea. Storms sometimes destroyed the barriers depositing sand and gravel over peat beds in Marazion Marsh, and in the foundations of many buildings in Wherrytown and Long Rock. The remains of these natural barriers can still be seen at Eastern Green and the dunes to the seaward of Marazion Marsh. The submerged forest in the intertidal area between Wherrytown and Long Rock is of national importance and is a County Geology Site.

At Loe Pool a barrier dammed the ria of the River Cober causing the formation of Cornwall's largest lake. Very little of the Loe Bar shingle is locally derived (compared with nearby Gunwalloe beach material to the south) and the deposits have been tentatively dated as Eocene. The composition of the bar deposits are: chalk flint 86%, quartz 9%, grit 2.6%, greensand chert 2% and serpentine 0.5%. The shingle coming from drowned terraces of the former river that flowed down the English Channel; the nearest onshore source is 120 miles (190 km) away in East Devon. Longshore drift is unlikely to have caused the formation because the bar is situated between two headlands but it plays an important part in the maintenance of the bar, with a strong current flowing to the south-east from Porthleven to Gunwalloe, depositing shingle along the bar. The ebb flow is not a simple reverse flow and is not strong enough to remove all the deposits. *

=== Marine Conservation Zone ===
The Mounts Bay Marine Conservation Zone (MCZ) was designated on 29 January 2016 and covers an area of Mount's Bay south of the coast from Long Rock to Cudden Point. The 12 km^{2} (4.6 sq mi) site includes the sea around St Michael's Mount and tidal reefs such as the Greeb, near Perranuthnoe, and the Long Rock. The MCZ protects habitats ranging from exposed high-energy rock on the coast to sand and muddy sand on the sea floor. The seagrass beds, Zostera marina, mainly grow in the sub-tidal zone and are important as a nursery area for fish and shellfish, as well as a feeding area for birds. Damage from the anchors and chains from moored boats can damage the beds.

Animals within the zone include stalked jellyfish such as Lucernariopsis campanulata and Lucernariopsis cruxmelitensis, and a fish the giant goby (Gobius cobitis).

On 19 August 2018, a white harbour porpoise was seen near Mount's Bay.

== History ==
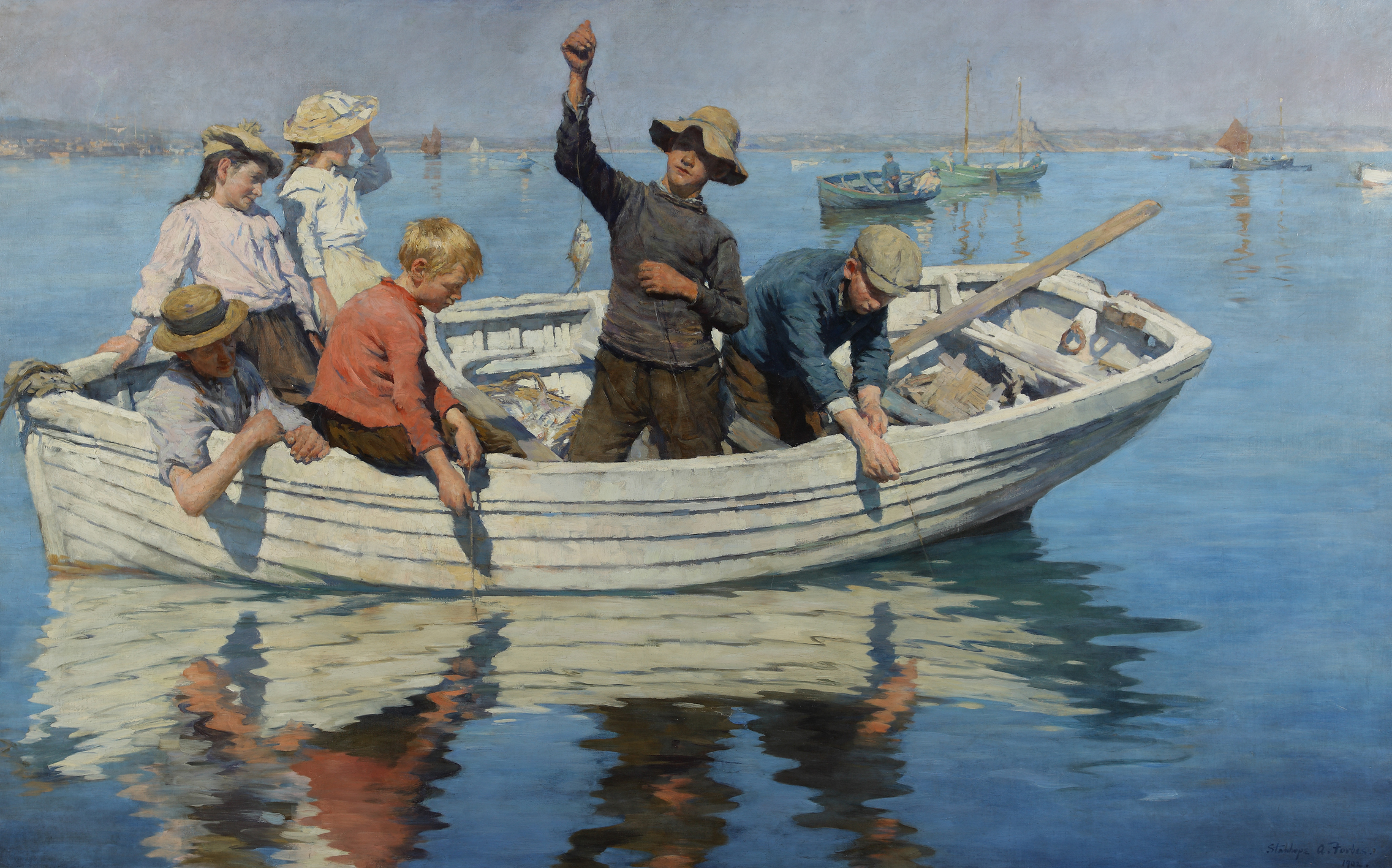
Chadding in Mount's Bay by Stanhope Forbes, 1902

=== Spanish attack ===
A Spanish raid took place over two days in August 1595 during the Anglo-Spanish war of 1585–1604. It was conducted by a Spanish naval squadron led by Carlos de Amésquita on patrol from Brittany. They landed, sacked and burned Newlyn, Mousehole, Penzance and Paul. A militia force led by Francis Godolphin was unable to drive the Spanish away.

=== Pirate attacks ===
In August 1625 "Turks took out of the church of Munigesca in Mount's Bay about sixty men, women and children and carried them away captives". Slavery in the Ottoman Empire and the Barbary slave trade was fundamental to its economy. The Barbary Pirates were then raiding Europe and they took more than a million Europeans off to the slave markets of Tripoli and elsewhere.

=== 1755 tsunami ===
On 1 November 1755, the Lisbon earthquake caused a tsunami to strike the Cornish coast at around 14:00. At Mount's Bay the sea rose 10 feet (3 m) at great speed and ebbed at the same rate.

== Settlements ==
Burgee of Mount's Bay Sailing Club, based in Marazion

There are several coastal towns and villages dotted around Mount's Bay of which the largest is Penzance. To the west are Newlyn, Paul, Mousehole and Lamorna, and to the east are Marazion, Perranuthnoe, Praa Sands, Porthleven and Mullion. The bay also incorporates many beaches, coves and features including Prussia Cove, Loe Pool (and Loe Bar), Church Cove, Poldhu Cove and Kynance Cove.

In the churchyard wall of the church of St. Paul Aurelian in Paul is the 1860 monument to Dolly Pentreath, according to tradition the last native speaker of the Cornish language.

Mount's Bay gives its name to Mounts Bay Academy, a secondary school in Heamoor that serves Penzance and the surrounding countryside.

== Industry ==
A number of mines were established along the shore and at least three were below the high water mark. An elvan dyke, rich in tin, runs nearly parallel with the Penzance promenade, at about 240 yards (220 m) from the shore. According to folklore, numerous veins of nearly pure cassiterite were worked by the ″old men″ in the early 18th-century. Over three summers, from 1778 Thomas Curtis sank a shaft on the Wherrytown reef and then built a 20-foot high wooden tower with a dressed stone breakwater at the base. In 1790, £600 worth of tin was produced by ten men and in 1792, the tin was worth £3000. By 1798, £70,000 worth of the tin was sold. In this year an American ship is said to have demolished the tower and machinery, during a storm and the mine closed. An 1823 attempt at reopening failed as did another in 1836 when a 40-inch cylinder engine was erected on the shore and sold by auction, four years later in 1840.

While not as rich in tin as the Wherrytown reef the Long Rock reef produced tin between 1819 and 1823. A lode containing needle antimony, copper, tin and mundic crosses the reef from east to west, and an argentiferous lead lode ran along the reef from north to south. Sir Arthur Russell, a leading mineralogist and mining historian A. K. Hamilton Jenkin visited the reef in the summer of 1956 and found a roughly circular depression in the rock, surrounded by large blocks of elvan which were intended for the breakwater around the shaft. A line of stones known as ″Parson's (Pascoe's) Row″ extends to the shore and would have probably supported the timbers of a pier, which would have carried the flat-rods from the onshore engine. A cutting excavated along the length of the lode indicates the removal of part of the lode.

== RFA Mount's Bay ==
Commissioned by the Royal Fleet Auxiliary in 2006, RFA Mount's Bay is the latest-design Landing Ship Dock, the Bay Class used by the Royal Navy. Mount's Bay has good affiliations with the Sea Cadet Unit TS Zephyr in Caterham, Surrey.
