= Helston Guildhall =

Municipal building in Helston, Cornwall, England

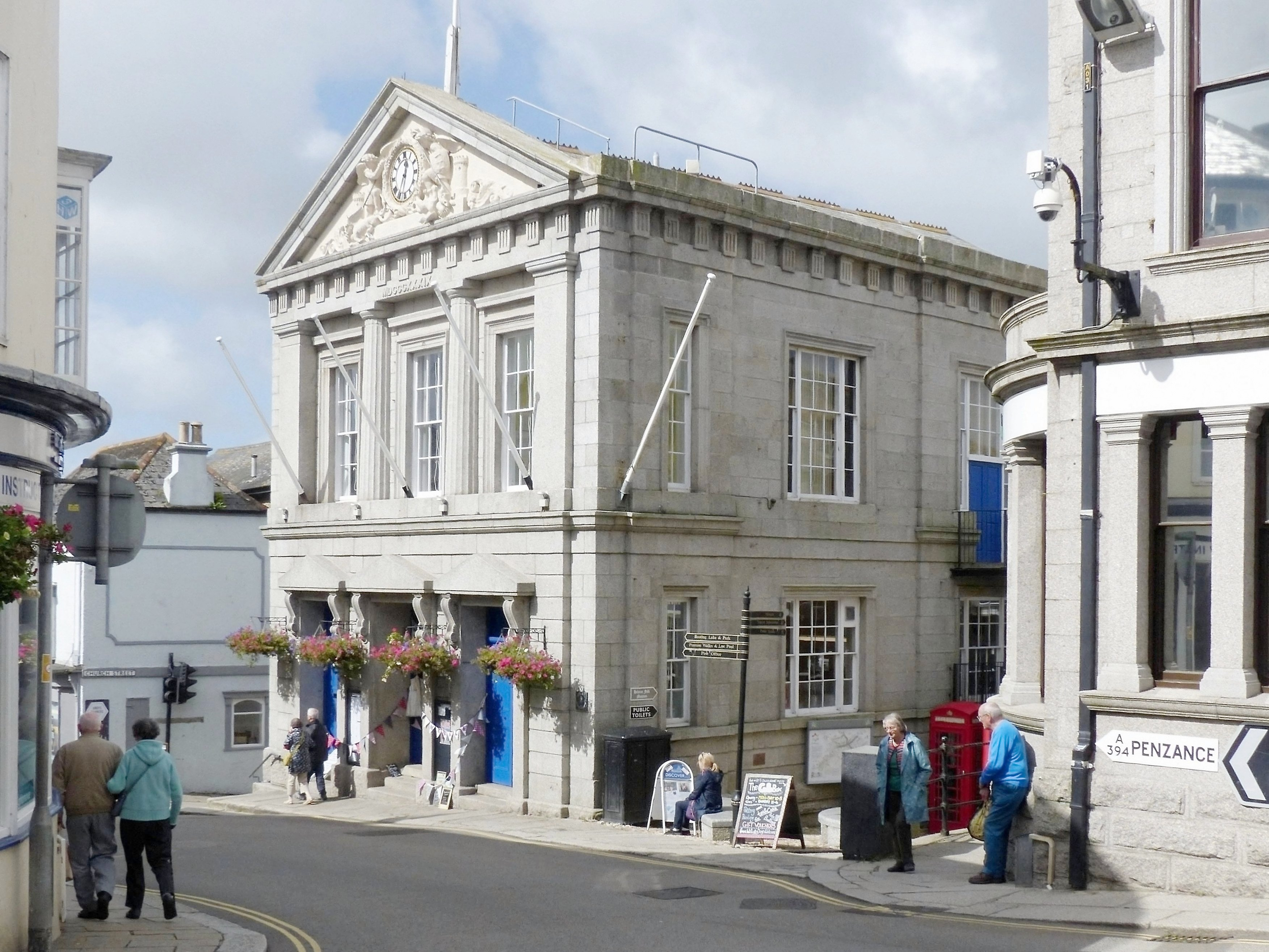
- Helston Guildhall

- Shown in Cornwall
- 50.1011°N 5.2745°W
- Location: Market Place, Helston

History
- Built: 1839

Site notes
- Architect: George Wightwick
- Architectural style: Neoclassical style

Listed Building – Grade II*
- Official name: Guildhall
- Designated: 22 May 1972
- Reference no.: 1196492

Helston Guildhall, formerly Helston Town Hall, is a municipal building on Market Place, Helston, Cornwall, England. The structure, which is the meeting place of Helston Town Council, is a Grade II* listed building.

== History ==
The first municipal building in Helston was a market house which was erected in 1576. In the 1830s, at the height of the prosperity of the local tin-mining industry, the borough leaders decided to demolish the old market hall and to replace it with two new structures: a guildhall, which would become the local courthouse, and, behind it, a new market hall, where local market trading would take place. (Note: The new market hall went on to become the Helston Museum in 1949.)

The new guildhall was designed by George Wightwick in the neoclassical style, built in ashlar stone and was completed in 1839. The design involved a symmetrical main frontage with three bays facing onto Coinagehall Street; on the ground floor, there were three doorways, each flanked by pilasters and brackets supporting solid triangular pediments. On the first floor, there were sash windows with cornices flanked by Doric order columns, or in the case of the outer bays, Doric order pilasters, supporting an entablature, which was inscribed with the date of construction, and a pediment with a clock supported by winged figures in the tympanum; the clock was by Wasbrough, Hale & Co. of Bristol. Internally, the principal rooms were the corn exchange on the ground floor, and the courtroom and the mayor's parlour on the first floor.

In the 19th century the building was primarily used as a courthouse: it accommodated hearings for both the county court and the court of petty sessions. In May 1907, the Lord Mayor of London, Sir William Treloar, whose ancestors came from the local area, received the Freedom of Helston at the guildhall, and also had the honour of leading the annual Furry Dance. The guildhall continued to serve as the headquarters of the borough council, with the old courtroom serving as the council chamber, for much of the 20th century but ceased to be the local seat of government after the enlarged Kerrier District Council was formed in 1974. Instead, Helston Town Council, formed in 1974, moved its staff into the guildhall and also used the council chamber as its meeting place.

Works of art in the guildhall include a painting by John Bryant Lane entitled "Christ Derided", and a portrait by Maurice Whinney of RAF officer, Wing Commander Guy Gibson, who was brought up in the local area.

== See also ==
- Grade II* listed buildings in Cornwall (A–G)
