= Treloar School =

School in Hampshire, UK for students with disabilities

Coordinates: 51.163°N 0.9565°W

Treloar School and College

Location
- Powell Drive; Holybourne, Hampshire, GU34 4GL; England

Information
- Type: Primary, Secondary, College, Special, Residential & Day
- Motto: Enabling Education
- Established: 1908 (as Lord Mayor Treloar Hospital)
- Founder: Sir William Purdie Treloar
- Department for Education URN: 116636 Tables
- Principal: Martin Ingram
- Gender: Coeducational
- Age: 2 to 25
- Enrolment: c. 170
- Houses: Brewer, Evans, Gauvain, Gloucester, Wessex
- Colour: Green
- Website: www.treloar.org.uk

Treloar School and College is a non-maintained residential and day special school and college for disabled children and young people, aged from 2 to 25 in Holybourne near Alton, Hampshire, UK.

== Aims and governance ==
The school and college aims to provide enabling education to the disabled, using a combination of teaching, care, occupational therapy, physiotherapy, and speech and language therapy. They are administered by Treloar Trust, a registered charity. The school, college, and trust are often referred to singly or collectively as "Treloar's". The official motto is "Treloar's: Enabling Education".

== History ==
In 1907, the then Lord Mayor of the City of London, Sir William Purdie Treloar, set up a 'Cripples' Fund' as his mayoral appeal. His aim was to build a hospital and school outside the city for children with non-pulmonary tuberculosis. On 13 June 1907 he wrote in his diary that Her Majesty Queen Alexandra 'came to Mansion House to open the Queen's Fete in aid of my Cripples' Fund'. In 1908, the boarding school and hospital were opened in Alton, as The Lord Mayor Treloar Cripples' Hospital and College. The fireplace surrounds in Wards 1–8, dating from 1930, were decorated with picture tiles of farmyard animals, farmyard scenes and domestic activities. Designed by E.E. Stickland and Joseph Roelants they were manufactured by Carter and Co.

In 1948 the National Health Service took over the hospital, and the Lord Mayor Treloar College moved from Alton, to a new site bought by the Trust in 1949 in the nearby village of Froyle. In 1965 the Florence Treloar School for Girls was opened in the village of Holybourne. In 1978, the two schools were combined under the Lord Mayor Treloar College name, with the Lower School housed at Froyle and the Upper School at Holybourne.

In 1995 the Holybourne campus became the Lord Mayor Treloar National Specialist College of Further Education. In 2000 this was shortened to Treloar College. The Froyle campus became Treloar School. After the launching of an appeal, Vision Treloar's, in 2010, the School, college, and Trust were consolidated on a new campus on the Holybourne site, that was opened in 2012 by Sophie, Countess of Wessex, who is the Trust's Royal Patron.

In 2004, the college became the first specialist college to be awarded 'outstanding' for the quality of its provision, leadership and management by Ofsted. In 2017, it was awarded 'Beacon College' status by the Department for Education and Science. The school received an 'inadequate' Ofsted assessment in 2011. It was rated 'outstanding' in 2016 and 2018.

== Infected blood scandal ==
During the 1970s and 1980s, the boys' school offered specialist care for haemophiliacs. With the introduction of Factor VIII treatment, between 1974 and 1987 many were injected with Factor VIII imported from the United States and manufactured from contaminated non-heat-treated blood plasma, and were infected with HIV and hepatitis. 90 out of 122 have since died. In 2019, a public inquiry into the National Health Service's use of contaminated blood products began taking evidence from those affected, and in 2021, heard statements from former Treloar's pupils who were infected there. In 2022, a lawsuit against the school was filed by survivors. In 2024, the Infected Blood Compensation Scheme was established. The scheme states that an 'Additional Autonomy award' of £15,000 will be available to all infected persons who attended Lord Mayor Treloar College.

in 2026 a memorial statue of two pupils, one with a sling and another holding a cane, embracing each other was installed.

== Headteachers and principals ==
Headteachers have included :

- 1953–1972: George Heywood
- 1972–1974: Johnston Smith
- 1974–1990: Alec Macpherson
- 1990–1997: Hartley Heard
- 1996–2006: Neil Clark
- 2006–2007: Heather Boardman
- 2007–2011: Harry Dicks
- 2011–2014: Melissa Farnham
- 2018–: Mia Dodsworth

College principals have included:

- 1994–1995: Jane Lones
- 1995–2006: Graham Jowett
- 2006–2008: Pat Teague
- 2014–2016: John Stone (Principal), School and College - Jo McSherrie
- 2016–current: Martin Ingram

== Sport ==
Treloar School has built a reputation of developing the sporting abilities of young people with physical disabilities. Many students continue their sporting progress at Treloar College and beyond. Particular strengths are in athletics, with many students showing Paralympic potential, boccia, and swimming. Many former students represented Great Britain at the 2012 Paralympics in London. A sports facility accommodating basketball, chair football, hockey, and tennis was opened in 2014.

== Notable alumni ==
- Ash Atalla, TV producer
- Spike Breakwell, comedian, writer, actor and musician
- Laurence Clark (comedian), disability rights broadcaster
- Paul Darke, academic, artist and disability rights activist
- Julie Fernandez, actress and disability rights campaigner
- Ben Rushgrove, Paralympic track athlete
- Rosaleen Moriarty-Simmonds, artist
- David Smith OBE, Paralympic Boccia athlete
