= The Loe =

Freshwater lake in Cornwall, England

- An Logh (Cornish)
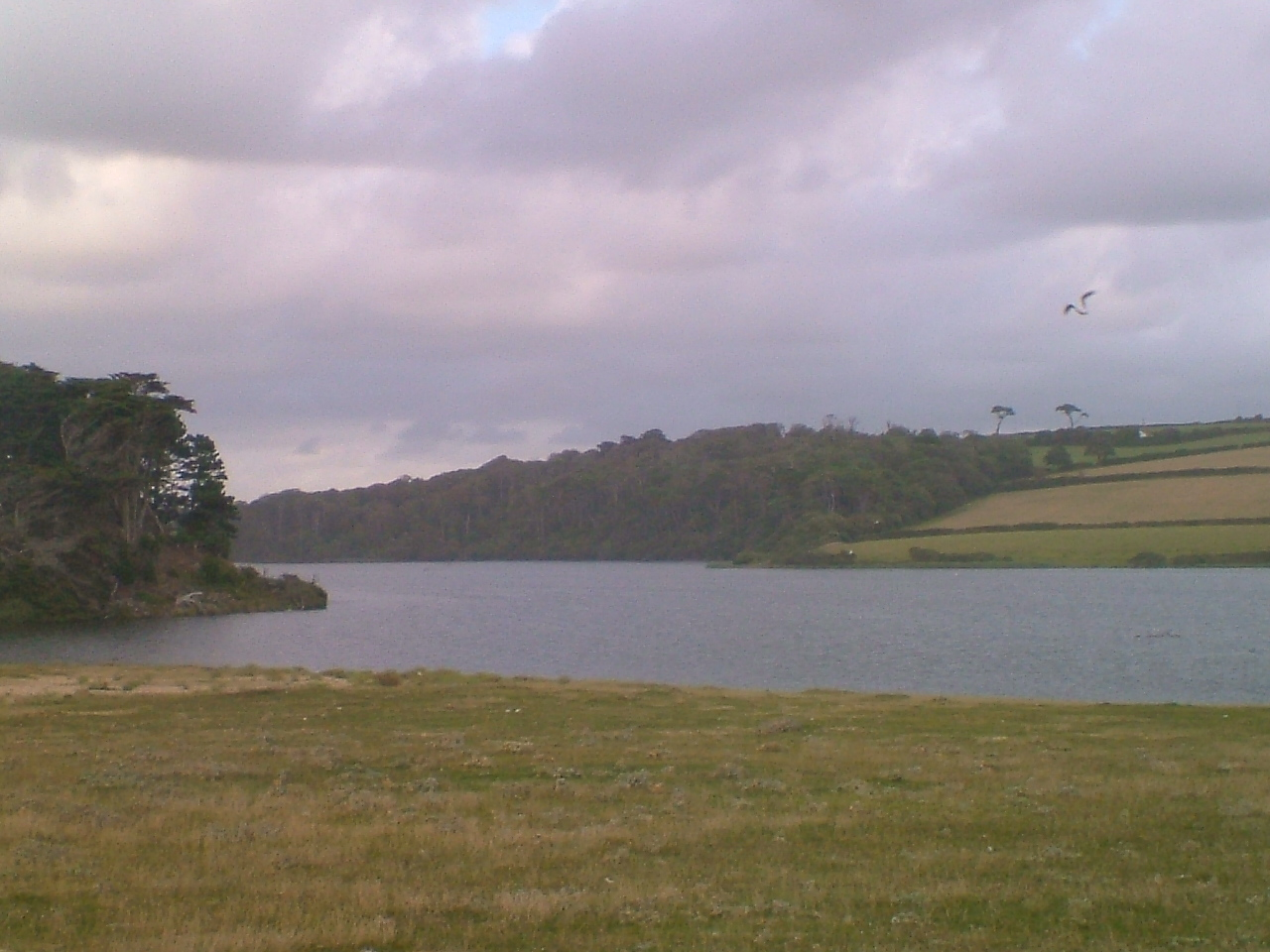

- Location within Cornwall
- Location: Cornwall
- Coordinates: 50°04′35″N 5°17′22″W
- Lake type: Eutrophic
- Primary inflows: River Cober
- Primary outflows: Mine adit Infiltration
- Basin countries: United Kingdom
- Max. length: 2 km (1.2 mi)
- Max. width: 0.8 km (0.50 mi)
- Surface area: 50 ha (120 acres)
- Max. depth: 6 m (20 ft)
- Surface elevation: 0 m (0 ft)
- Islands: None
- Settlements: Helston

The Loe (Cornish: An Logh), also known as Loe Pool, is the largest natural freshwater lake (50 hectares (120 acres)) in Cornwall, United Kingdom. The earliest recorded appearance of this simple name form was in 1337, when it was called "La Loo", but is mentioned as 'the lake' in 1302; Situated between Porthleven and Gunwalloe and downstream of Helston, it is separated from Mount's Bay by the shingle bank of Loe Bar. Both the Loe (including the southern arm known as Carminowe Creek) and Loe Bar are situated within the Penrose Estate, which is administered by the National Trust, and are designated as a Site of Special Scientific Interest by Natural England. It is within the Cornwall Area of Outstanding Natural Beauty and is considered a classic Geological Conservation Review Site. The South West Coast Path, which follows the coast of south-west England from Somerset to Dorset passes over Loe Bar.

== Formation of Loe Bar ==
The Loe was originally the estuary of the River Cober, a ria or drowned river valley now blocked by a sand and shingle bar with a freshwater lake behind. The valley can be traced several miles out to sea. The age of the bar is disputed, with estimates ranging from several thousand years to c. 700 years. With the melting of ice-sheets and glaciers after the last ice age, sea levels rose and reached their present levels about 6,000 years ago during what is known as the Flandrian Marine Trangression. The most likely origin is a barrier beach, (formed by wave action rather than by tides) that gradually moved onshore, as the sea level rose during the Holocene. The shingle coming from drowned terraces of the former river that flowed down the English Channel (the nearest onshore source is 120 miles away in East Devon). It is thought that longshore drift plays an important part in the maintenance of the Bar, with a strong current flowing to the south-east from Porthleven to Gunwalloe, depositing shingle along the Bar. The ebb flow is not a simple reverse flow and is not strong enough to remove all the deposits. The bar itself is a sediment sink as far as the overall beach budget is concerned. The deposits have been tentatively dated as Eocene and compared with Gunwalloe beach material, very little of the Loe Bar shingle is locally derived. The composition of the Bar deposits are: chalk flint 86%, quartz 9%, gritstone 2.6%, greensand chert 2% and serpentine 0.5%.

The bar has increased significantly in historic times. Leland who visited the west country in 1542, reported that the bar was breached once in 3–4 years by storms causing sea water to mix with fresh in the pool, but it soon reinstated. Carew's Survey of Cornwall (1602) warns wayfarers using the bar as a footpath against times when the bar is washed away by the river's force "and some have so miscarried". Early maps such as Speed (1674) and Tindal (1732) do not show the bar but Martyn's 'New and Accurate Map of the County of Cornwall' (1784) shows the 'Loe Bar'. However seawater still accumulated in the Loe from gales in the nineteenth century and had to be released by cutting the bar. The deepest sediments retrieved from the pool date from the first quarter of the 19th century. Cutting the bar would often reduce the height in the pool by 6.2 metres (20 ft) because of the strong rush of water exiting from the pool (so that the breach in the bar was at least that deep) leaving much of the lake empty, and 1875 on was probably the first time in its history that the pool was predominantly fresh throughout the year rather than salt or brackish, producing significant changes in the lake ecology.

Daniel Defoe in his tour around Great Britain writes that the River Cober 'makes a tolerable good harbour and several ships are loaded with tin', [between Lowertown and Helston, but not to the sea]; although over one hundred years before Defoe, Richard Carew (1602) described Loe Bar as "The shingle was relatively porous and fresh water could leave and seawater enter depending, on the relative heights of the pool and sea" Defoe, writing in the early 18th century, appears to state that ships were then able to trade up the Cober to Helston; this would seem to be the origin of other documentary sources claiming a port for the town in the historic period. There is no known archaeological evidence for the existence of a port* at Helston and there is no primary evidence to support Defoe's account.

To prevent flooding in parts of Helston, the Bar has occasionally been breached, a practice known locally as "cutting", with the last occurring in 1984. The Bar has always resealed itself.

The 2013 investigations by the Camborne School of Mines project team, show a chart of a cross-section of part of the valley between Loe Bar and Helston as being built up from a depth of twenty-five feet of silt, upon a belt seven feet deep of sea sand, above layers of peat from the remains of vegetation or of the ancient forest, that once covered Mount's Bay.

== Historical records ==
- 13th century: The townspeople of Helston buy the rights to the port of Gweek at the head of the Helford River.
- 1272 and 1302: King Edward I granted certain lands in or near Helston to William de Treville on condition that he should, at his own expense, bring a boat and fishing-hook and net for the King's use on the Loe, as often as he should visit the Borough.
- 1281: The first documentation of the name Penrose; John de Penrose.
- 1534–43: Visits by John Leland. First to mention "... the casting up of sands that made a bar stopping the River Cober from flowing out to Sea".
- 1602: Richard Carew. "The shingle was relatively porous and fresh water could leave and seawater enter depending, on the relative heights of the pool and sea".
- 1771: Penrose bought by the Rogers family for £11,000.
- 1780: Adit constructed to prevent back-flooding of the Castle Wary silver and lead mine, also known as Wheal Pool.
- 1796: Wreck of an unidentified troopship with over 600 drowned (possibly one of Admiral Christian's West Indies convoy)
- 1807: Over one hundred people were drowned when the Captain of HMS Anson, beached the 44-gun frigate on the Bar when caught in storm on her way to the Brest blockade. A memorial cross to the dead can be seen on the coastal slope near Carminowe Creek. A consequence of this disaster was the development of the rocket life-saving apparatus by Henry Trengrouse who witnessed the wreck, and an Act of Parliament for the Christian burial for those lost at sea.
- 1837: Report on the possibility of creating a harbour by the civil-engineer James Rendle. The estimated cost of £118,523 was considered too expensive to take the project further.
- circa 1850: Tin waste from the mines at Porkellis Moor begin to block the inner face of the Bar reducing the porosity.
- 1865: Breach of the Bar.
- 1874: The last known occurrence of manual cutting.
- 1881: The pool was frozen from end to end and youngsters skated on the ice.
- 1889: Enlargement of the 1780 adit which regulated outflow.
- 1924: Freak wave caused flooding in Helston.
- 1938: Mining activity ceased up river.
- circa 1940: Loe Bar mined and timber baulks or booms moored on the surface of the Loe to prevent seaplanes landing. A pillbox was built near Bar Lodge. By 2010 erosion had caused the pillbox to fall onto the beach.
- 1974: Ownership of the Penrose Estate (apart from the house) is transferred to the National Trust.
- 1979: First time a channel is cut by JCB.
- 1984: Heavy rains in October and November lead to the last cutting of the 20th century.
- 2018: 3 6-tonne pumps set up on Loe Bar to prevent flooding in Helston

== Mining ==
The extraction of metals in the Cober valley was carried out for centuries with silver and lead being mined at Wheal Pool (also known as Castle Wary mine) in 1780. In the mid-19th century tin-waste (leavings) from mines on Porkellis Moor was reducing the porosity of the bar. From Trenear to the Loe tinners, were able to work-up (i.e. extract) the waste, as recorded in October 1880, following heavy rain the week before. Twenty-two tons of black tin was sold that year from the Loe Pool stream for £759, although the owner Samuel Stephens later sold some of his machinery as sales were not as expected. The auction took place on Wednesday, 6 September 1882 at the Loe Pool Steam Works of ″Materials And Other Effects Thereof″. Included was a 14 feet (4.3 m) x 5 feet (1.5 m) water wheel, two large pulverizer's (under patent to Mr Stephens), wooden buildings, timber and launders (raised, wooden leats).

Mining activity ceased in the Cober valley in 1938.

== Site of Special Scientific Interest ==
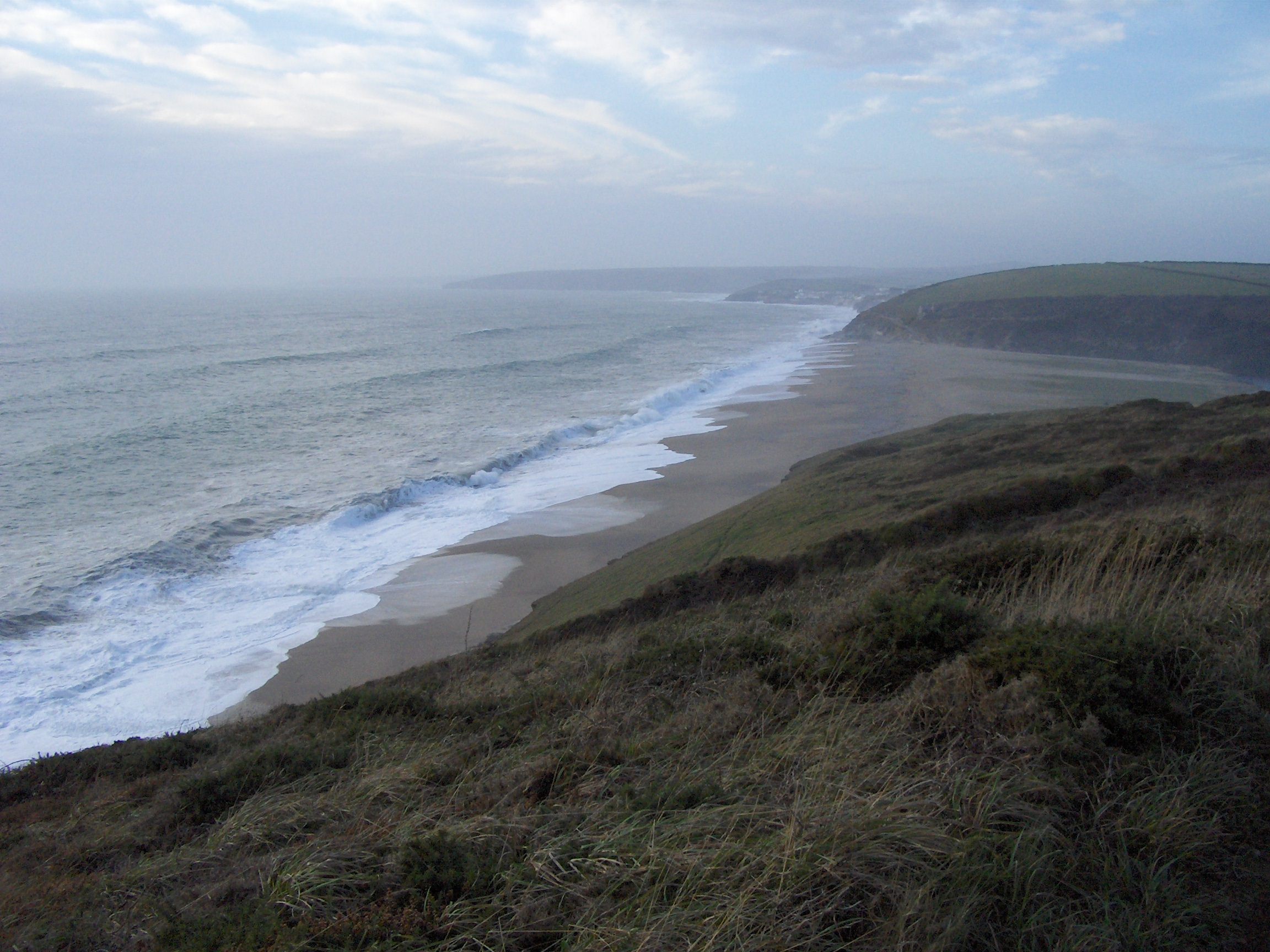
Loe Bar

The beach from Porthleven to Gunwalloe is important for coastal geomorphology as it is formed by a barrier beach moving onshore during the Holocene and maintained by a predominantly south-west wave regime. During storms the Bar can be overrun by the sea forming a series of washover fans resulting in, annual laminated sediments, which are unique in Great Britain. The habitat is unique in Cornwall with rare species of plants, bryophytes, algae and insects. It is also an important overwintering site for nearly eighty species of birds and up to 1,200 wildfowl. At the last assessment on 8 September 2010 the lake was found to be unfavourable condition, with no change from the previous assessment. The reasons being inappropriate water levels and water pollution, due to agriculture run off and discharge from the sewage treatment works below Helston.

=== Flora ===
The pool provides a scarce habitat in Cornwall with rare species of algae, bryophytes and flowering plants. Aquatic plants include amphibious bistort (Persicaria amphibia), horned pondweed (Zannichellia palustris), perfoliate pondweed (Potamogeton perfoliatus), shore-weed (Littorella uniflora) and six-stamened waterwort (Elatine hexandra). In 1898 a stonewort (Nitella hyalina) was first discovered in Britain at Penrose Creek by Canon G R Bullock-Webster. The last record was in 1914.

An area on the east side of Loe Pool has been cleared for the re-introduction of strapwort (Corrigiola litoralis), a plant identified by Natural England as a plant at high risk of going extinct by 2020. The plant was first recorded on the beach near the tin mine at Helston (which is on Loe Pool) by F Borone in 1800. By 1908 it was becoming rarer and was last recorded here in 1915, its loss was believed to have been caused by a lack of fluctuating water levels following work to the adit (outflow from the lake). By the 20th-century strapwort was only growing, within the UK, at Slapton Ley in south Devon. Seed was grown in a greenhouse at Paignton Zoo, Devon by the Whitley Wildlife Conservation Trust (WWCT), and in May 2015 over 1,000 seedlings were planted on the east side of Loe Pool.

=== Fauna ===
Loe Bar is the only site in Britain where the subspecies leechi of the sandhill rustic (Luperina nickerlii) moth is found. Two pupae were found in the sand by the lepidopterists' Barry Goater and M Leech in September 1974. The larvae of leechi feed on the base of the stems and the roots of sand couch-grass (Elymus farctus), from September to early-July. The moths fly from late-July to September. Four sub-species of the sandhill rustic occur in the British Isles.

Porcellio dilatatus is an uncommon species of woodlouse with scattered records from most of the British Isles. Loe Pool is the only Cornish site. Also found on each of the inhabited islands of the Isles of Scilly.

== Folklore ==
The Loe is reputed to be the lake in which Sir Bedivere cast King Arthur's sword, Excalibur, Dozmary Pool on Bodmin Moor shares this legend which is comparatively recent, Tennyson choosing Loe Pool in his Idylls of the King.

A local legend states that the giant Tregeagle was doomed to remove the sand from Gunwalloe to Porthleven, from which the sea would return it. In the course of one of his journeys he is said to have dropped a bag of sand at the entrance of Helston harbour and so to have formed the Bar. Local superstition also warns that the Loe claims a victim every seven years, a legend shared with other waters such as the River Dart.

== See also ==
- Loe Bar Wreck
