= Helston =

Town in Cornwall, England

Coordinates: 50.10°N 5.27°W

Helston: Cornish: Hellys
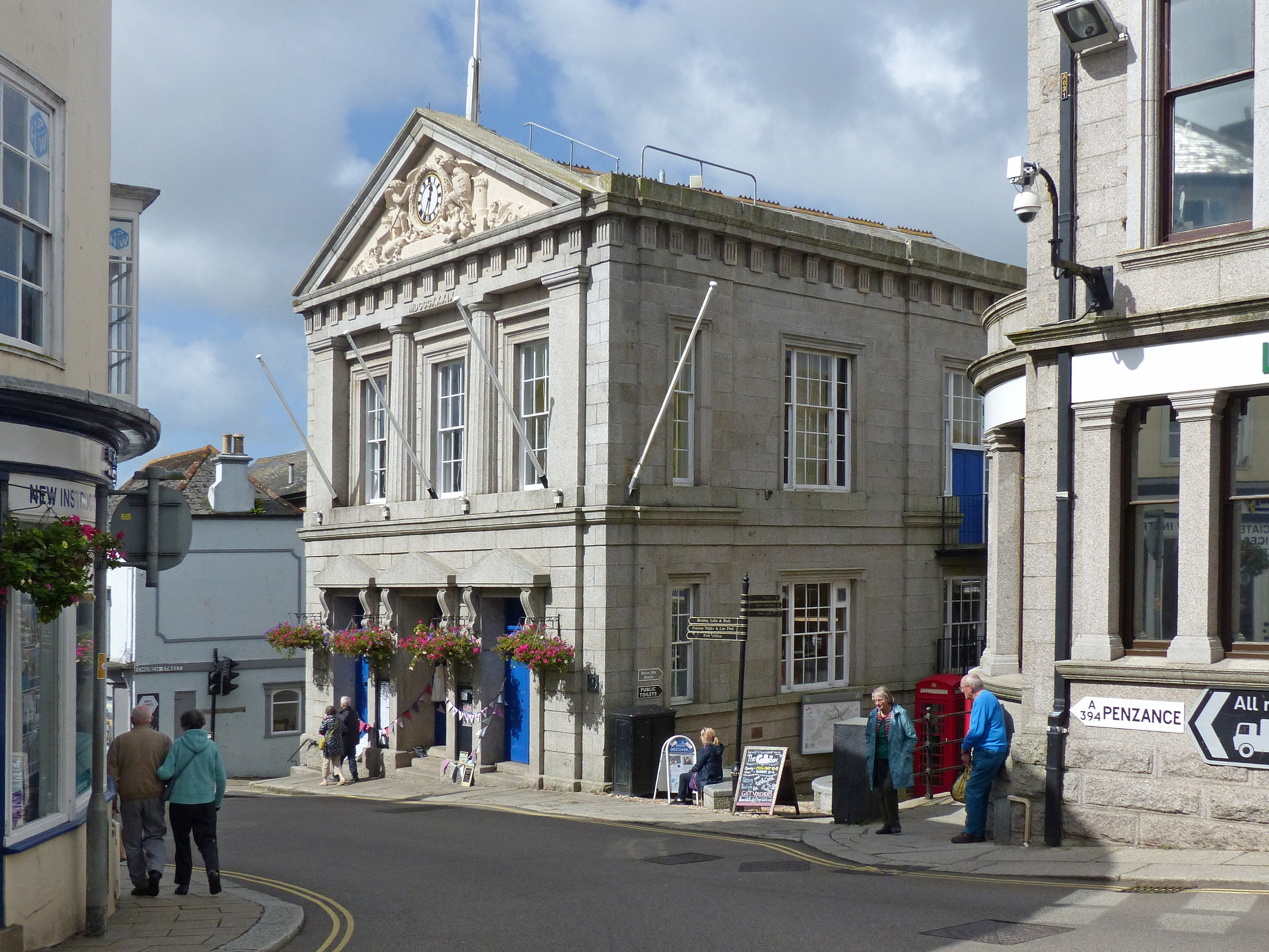
- Coinagehall Street is the main street of Helston. The Guildhall flies a flag

- Location within Cornwall
- Interactive map of Helston
- Population: 11,611 (Parish, 2021); 11,360 (Built up area, 2021)
- OS grid reference: SW664273
- Civil parish: Helston
- Unitary authority: Cornwall
- Ceremonial county: Cornwall
- Region: South West
- Country: England
- Sovereign state: United Kingdom
- Post town: HELSTON
- Postcode district: TR12, TR13
- Dialling code: 01326
- Police: Devon and Cornwall
- Fire: Cornwall
- Ambulance: South Western
- UK Parliament: St Ives

Helston (Cornish: Hellys [ˈhɛlːɪs]) is a town and civil parish in Cornwall, England. It is situated at the northern end of the Lizard Peninsula, approximately 12 miles (19.3 km) east of Penzance and 9 miles (14.5 km) south-west of Falmouth. Helston is the most southerly town on the island of Great Britain and is around 1 1/2 mi (2.4 km) farther south than Penzance. At the 2021 census, the population of the parish was 11,611 and that of the built up area was 11,360.

The former stannary and cattle market town is best known for the annual Furry Dance, known locally as the Flora Dance. It is said to originate from the medieval period; however, the Hal-an-Tow is reputed to be of Celtic origin. The associated song and music, The Floral Dance, is known to have been written in 1911. (Note: The music and lyrics were written in 1911 by Kate Emily Barkley ("Katie") Moss (1881-1947), who was a professional violinist, pianist and concert singer.) In 2001, the town celebrated the 800th anniversary of the granting of its charter.

== History ==
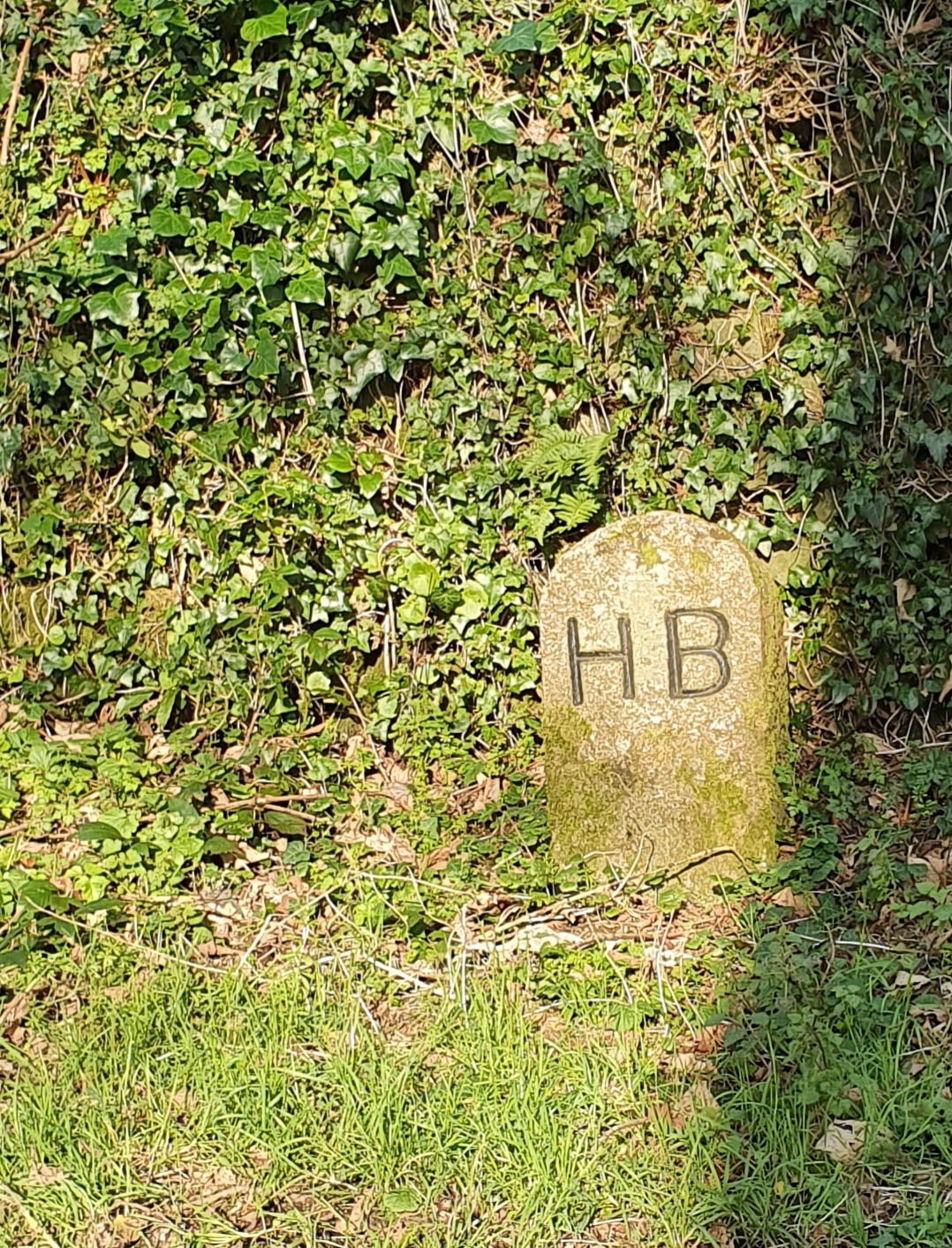
The borough boundary stone at Nansloe

The name comes from the Cornish "hen lys" (or "old court") and "ton" added later to denote a Saxon manor; the Domesday Book refers to Henliston (which survives as the name of a road in the town). Only one edition refers to 'Henlistona'. It was granted its charter by King John on 15 April 1201 for the price of forty marks of silver. It was here that tin ingots were weighed to determine the tin coinage duty due to the Duke of Cornwall when a number of stannary towns were authorised by royal decree. A document of 1396 examined by Charles Henderson shows that the old form "Hellys" was still in use The manor of Helston in Kerrier was one of the seventeen Antiqua maneria of the Duchy of Cornwall. The seal of the borough of Helston was St Michael his wings expanded and standing on a gateway. The two towers domed upon the up-turned dragon, impaling it with his spear and bearing upon his left arm an escutcheon of the arms of England, viz Gu three lions passant guardant in pale Or, with the legend "Sigillum comunitatis helleston burg".

It is a matter of debate as to whether Helston was once a port, albeit no actual records exist. A common belief is that, in the 13th century, Loe Bar formed a barrier across the mouth of the River Cober cutting the town off from the sea. Geomorphologists believe the bar was most likely formed by rising sea levels, after the last ice age, blocking the river and creating a barrier beach. The beach is formed mostly of flint and the nearest source is found offshore under the drowned terraces of the former river that flowed between England and France, and now under the English Channel.

Daniel Defoe described Helston (1725) in his tour around Great Britain thus, ″This town is large and populous, and has four spacious streets, a handsome church, and a good trade: this town also sends members to Parliament.' He also mentions that the River Cober makes a tolerable good harbour and several ships are loaded with tin, [between Lowertown and Helston, but not to the sea]; although over one hundred years before Defoe, Richard Carew (1602) described Loe Bar as "The shingle was relatively porous and fresh water could leave and seawater enter depending, on the relative heights of the pool and sea." Defoe's description seems to be the first and possibly the origin of other sources claiming Helston to be a port in the historic period.

Loe Pool is referred to in a document of 1302, implying the existence of Loe Bar at this date, if not much earlier, and thus precluding the passage of shipping up the Cober. At the same time it was recorded that the burgesses of Helston exercised jurisdiction over the ships anchored at Gweek, but no mention was made of ships at Helston, and no customs records or other documentation of port traffic relating to Helston survives; thus confirming the fact that Gweek has for centuries been the recognized port of Helston. There is no known archaeological evidence for the existence of a port* at Helston and there is no primary evidence to support Defoe's account. Leland's description of the Loe Pool is thus:

"Lo Poole is a 2 miles in length, and betwixt it and the mayn se, is but a barre of sand: and ons in 3 or 4 yeres, what by the wait of the fresch water and rage of the se, it brekith out, and then the fresch and salt water metyng makith a wonderful noise. But sone after, the mouth is barrid again with sande. At other tymes the superfluite of the water of Lo Poole drenith out through the sandy barre into the se. If this barre might be alway kept open, it wold be a goodly haven up to Hailestoun."

However, contributing to the belief of a port at Helston was the discovery of what some people believe to be slipways and mooring rings, during excavations around 1968. There was no known shipping from the sea after 1260, but before 1200, in 'the 1182 record of Godric of Helleston paying a fine of ten marks for exporting his corn out of England from Helston without a licence.' This could be considered the most significant piece of documentary evidence signifying Helston's former port days, though it does not prove the case. At the time of Domesday Book, Gweek had no inhabitants whilst Helston was the largest settlement in the west of Cornwall, with 113 households. In 1837, a plan was drawn up to open Loe Pool to shipping using a pier to counteract siltation, but it was never carried out.

The site of Helston Castle is now a bowling green near the Grylls Monument, which has been there since 1760. The castle was built in 1280 as a simple stone structure for Edmund, Earl of Cornwall. By 1478, it had fallen into disuse and ruin.

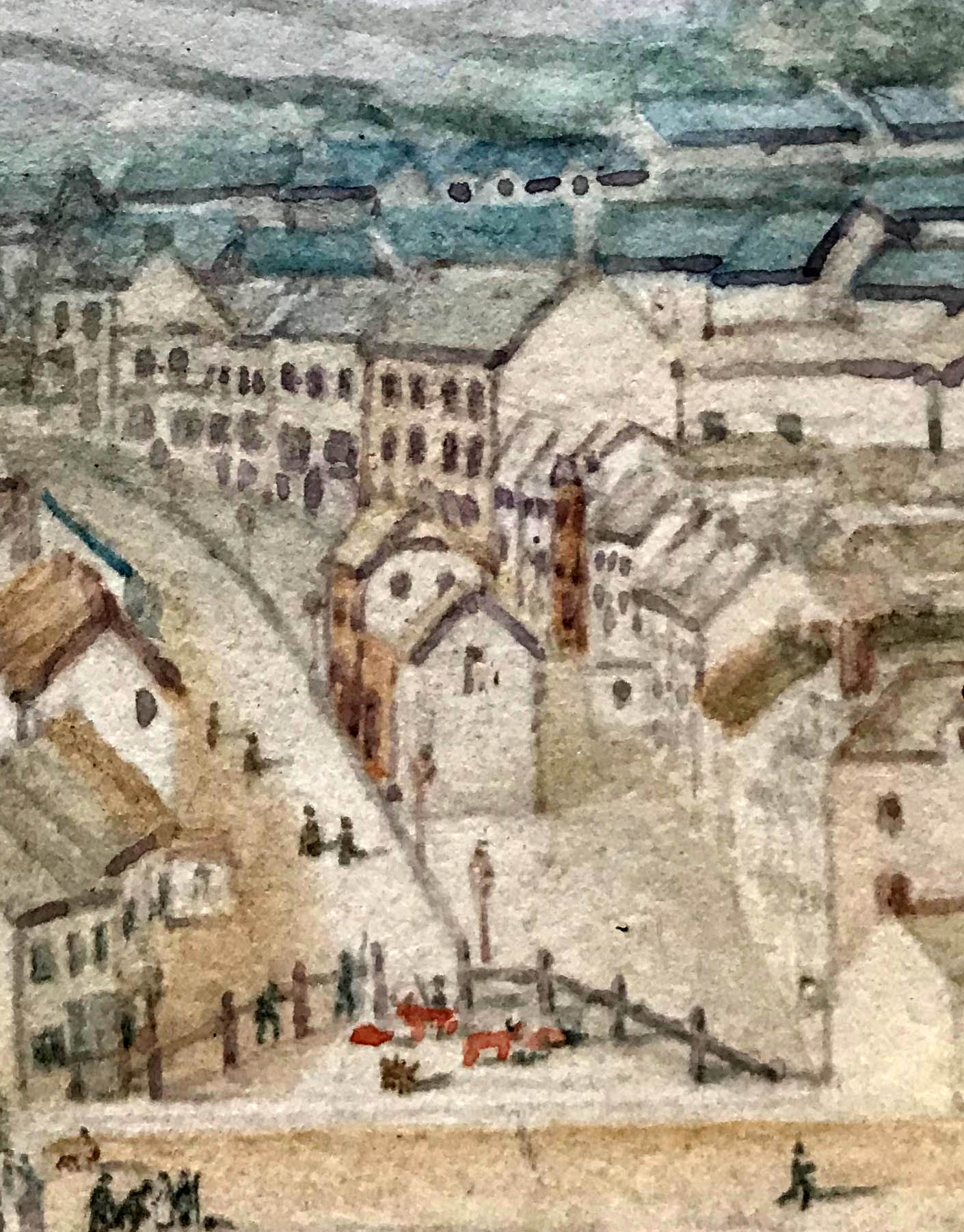
Helston's Coinage Hall, c.1796

A free chapel of ease perhaps also built for Edmund, Earl of Cornwall before 1283 was dissolved by the chantries act 1547 and turned into Helston's coinage hall. This was later demolished by public subscription raised by Helston's sitting M.P., Charles Abbot, following his return in the 1796 general election.

== Geography ==
Helston is situated along the banks of the River Cober in Cornwall. Downstream is Cornwall's largest natural lake, Loe Pool, formed when a shingle bar blocked the mouth of the river by rising sea levels forming a barrier beach. To the south is the Lizard Peninsula, an area important for its complex geology and wildlife habitats.

=== Climate ===
Helston has an oceanic climate (Köppen climate classification Cfb). It is one of the mildest places in the country and frosts are rarely severe. The nearest Met Office weather station is RNAS Culdrose, approximately 1 mile south-east of the town centre. Temperature extremes in the area since 1960 have ranged from −10.9 °C (12.4 °F) during January 1987, and up to 30.6 °C (87.1 °F) in June 1976. The lowest temperature in recent years was −6.2 °C (20.8 °F) in December 2009. Snow occurs in median every second year, almost in 2–3 days in line or one alone, most often in January or February.

Climate data for Culdrose (Note: Weather station is located 1.0 mile (1.6 km) from the Helston town centre.) (1991–2020 normals, extremes 1960–present)
Month	Jan	Feb	Mar	Apr	May	Jun	Jul	Aug	Sep	Oct	Nov	Dec	Year
Record high °C (°F)	14.9 (58.8)	15.2 (59.4)	19.4 (66.9)	21.9 (71.4)	26.8 (80.2)	30.6 (87.1)	28.8 (83.8)	29.8 (85.6)	24.5 (76.1)	23.2 (73.8)	18.6 (65.5)	15.9 (60.6)	30.6 (87.1)
Mean daily maximum °C (°F)	9.4 (48.9)	9.4 (48.9)	10.4 (50.7)	12.3 (54.1)	14.8 (58.6)	17.3 (63.1)	19.0 (66.2)	19.1 (66.4)	17.6 (63.7)	14.7 (58.5)	12.0 (53.6)	10.2 (50.4)	13.9 (57.0)
Daily mean °C (°F)	6.9 (44.4)	6.7 (44.1)	7.7 (45.9)	9.2 (48.6)	11.7 (53.1)	14.2 (57.6)	16.0 (60.8)	16.2 (61.2)	14.6 (58.3)	12.1 (53.8)	9.4 (48.9)	7.7 (45.9)	11.0 (51.8)
Mean daily minimum °C (°F)	4.4 (39.9)	4.1 (39.4)	4.9 (40.8)	6.0 (42.8)	8.5 (47.3)	11.1 (52.0)	13.0 (55.4)	13.2 (55.8)	11.6 (52.9)	9.6 (49.3)	6.9 (44.4)	5.2 (41.4)	8.2 (46.8)
Record low °C (°F)	−10.9 (12.4)	−8.4 (16.9)	−6.1 (21.0)	−3.7 (25.3)	−1.2 (29.8)	3.3 (37.9)	5.3 (41.5)	6.0 (42.8)	2.2 (36.0)	−0.8 (30.6)	−6.7 (19.9)	−6.3 (20.7)	−10.9 (12.4)
Average precipitation mm (inches)	106.7 (4.20)	83.0 (3.27)	72.4 (2.85)	65.0 (2.56)	54.3 (2.14)	60.2 (2.37)	63.5 (2.50)	74.0 (2.91)	69.3 (2.73)	97.0 (3.82)	120.0 (4.72)	115.6 (4.55)	981.2 (38.63)
Average precipitation days (≥ 1.0 mm)	16.4	13.3	12.2	11.4	9.1	9.2	9.8	10.9	10.6	14.6	16.8	17.0	151.2
Mean monthly sunshine hours	59.5	84.1	113.2	177.7	205.9	203.3	195.9	185.1	150.4	108.5	74.1	53.3	1,610.9
Source 1: Met Office
Source 2: Starlings Roost Weather

== Governance ==
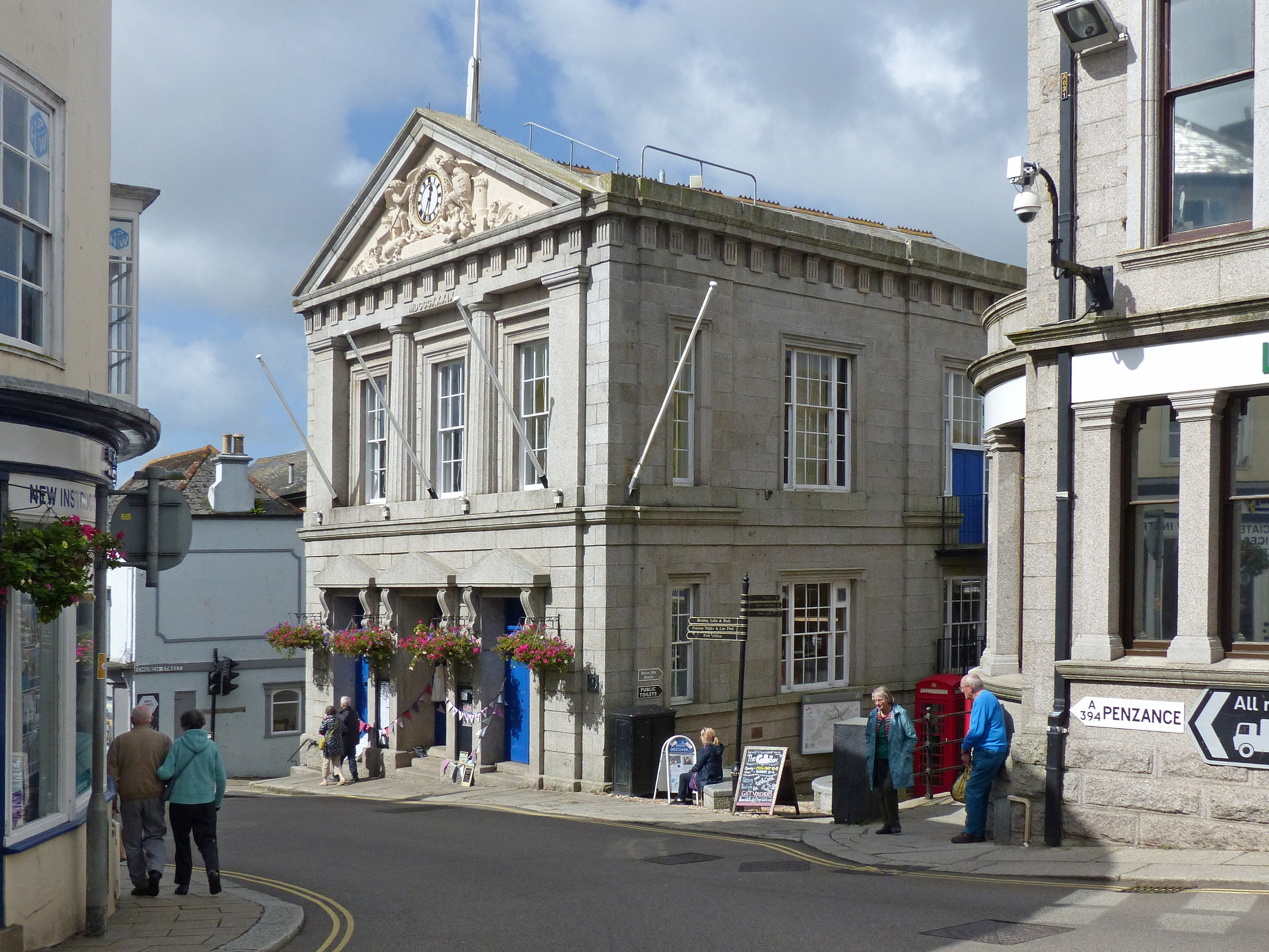
Helston Guildhall, built in 1839. It contains the council chamber, mayor's offices, and a function room, and is the starting point for the dances on Flora Day

There are two tiers of local government covering Helston, at parish (town) and unitary authority level: Helston Town Council and Cornwall Council. The town council is based at Helston Guildhall in Market Place, which was built in 1839.

For national elections, Helston forms part of the St Ives constituency, which covers the western part of Cornwall and the Isles of Scilly. The current Member of Parliament is Andrew George, a Liberal Democrat.

=== Administrative history ===
Helston historically formed part of the ancient parish of Wendron in the Kerrier Hundred of Cornwall. Helston was an ancient borough, with its earliest surviving charter having been issued by King John in 1201. From 1298 the town also formed the Helston parliamentary borough (constituency). Helston was reformed to become a municipal borough in 1836 under the Municipal Corporations Act 1835, which standardised how most boroughs operated across the country.

The borough remained part of the parish of Wendron into the 19th century. From the 17th century onwards, parishes were gradually given various civil functions under the poor laws, in addition to their original ecclesiastical functions. In some cases, including Wendron, the civil functions were exercised by subdivisions of the parish rather than the parish as a whole. Poor law functions were administered separately for Helston and the rest of Wendron parish. In 1866, the legal definition of 'parish' was changed to be the areas used for administering the poor laws, and so Helston became a separate civil parish from Wendron. In ecclesiastical terms, Helston became a separate ecclesiastical parish from Wendron in 1845.

The borough of Helston was significantly enlarged in 1934, taking in areas from the neighbouring parishes of Breage, Sithney and Wendron. The village of Porthleven was absorbed into the borough of Helston as part of those changes. Prior to 1934, Porthleven had straddled the parishes of Breage and Sithney.

The borough of Helston was abolished in 1974 under the Local Government Act 1972, when the area became part of the Kerrier district. A successor parish called Helston was created at the same time, covering the area of the abolished borough. As part of the 1974 reforms, parish councils were given the right to declare their parishes to be a town, allowing them to take the title of town council and giving the title of mayor to the council's chairperson. The new parish council for Helston exercised this right, taking the name Helston Town Council.

In 1985, a new parish of Porthleven was created, removing it from Helston parish.

Kerrier district was abolished in 2009. Cornwall County Council then took on district-level functions, making it a unitary authority, and was renamed Cornwall Council.

== Transport ==
Helston lies on the A394 road. To the west, the A394 leads to Penzance; to the north-east it leads to Penryn where it joins the A39, which leads south to Falmouth and north-east to Truro. The B3297 runs north from Helston to Redruth.

The nearest railway station is Redruth on the Cornish Main Line; Great Western Railway operates services between London Paddington and Penzance. The Helston branch line railway served the town until closure in the early 1960s. The branch left the Great Western Railway's main line at Gwinear Road, near Hayle, and ran 8.5 miles (13.7 km) south to terminate at Helston railway station. The Helston Railway Preservation Company is undertaking the restoration of part of the line.

Bus services link Helston to the railway network; First Kernow formerly provided the U4 bus service from Penzance station to Falmouth before they announced on November 21, 2025, their plan to cease operations in Cornwall on the February 14, 2026. Go Cornwall Bus have since replaced the U4 route with services 2/2A from Penzance station to Helston/ Mullion School and service 3 from Helston to Falmouth. Route 34 connects Redruth station with Lizard and is operated by Go Cornwall Bus.

The nearest airport is Newquay Airport which is approximately 35 miles (56 km) north-east of Helston. This is the main commercial airport for Cornwall with regular scheduled services to many parts of the UK.

== Culture and community ==
=== Flora Day ===
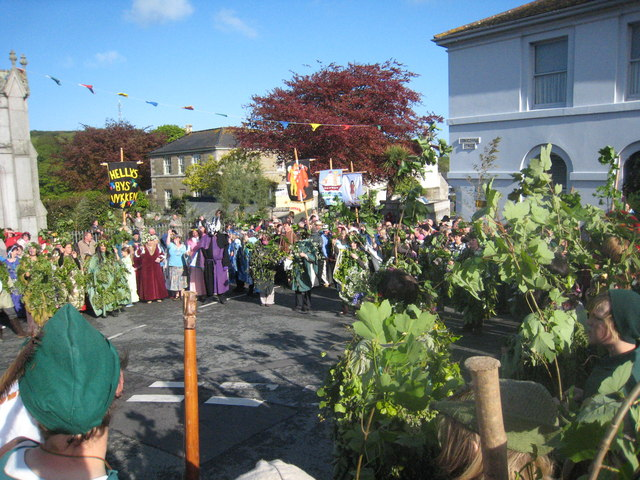
The Hal an Tow celebration

Flora Day occurs annually, on 8 May (except when the date falls on a Sunday or Monday — Monday being Market Day — when it is the preceding Saturday) Helston hosts the Furry Dance.

There are four dances throughout the day, the first starting at 7am (historically for domestic servants), the ladies in summer frocks and the gentlemen in white shirts and dark grey trousers with neckties bearing the town crest, loaned for the day. The second dance at 9.50am is when children from the town's schools dance dressed all in white, the individual schools denoted by the head dresses that the girls wear. The premier dance follows at Midday when the "gentry of the County" dance, the ladies in long ballgowns topped off with picture hats and the gentlemen wearing full morning dress. The final dance of the day begins at 5pm, a dance historically for the tradespeople of the town. Participants in this dance are the only dancers to dance around the town twice, having already danced in the 7am dance.

Only Helston-born people can dance in the lead set in each dance and the first male and female will only lead that dance once in their lifetime. Flora Day is administered by Stewards only. Helston Town Band play accompany all four dances on a long route around the town. Houses and shops of the town are festooned with bluebells, campions and green foliage. Specific dances (not including the children's dance) pass through various private buildings, shops and grounds. The origins of the dance are not definitively known, possibly a pre-Christian celebration of the passing of winter.

On the same day the "Hal an Tow", another celebration of the coming of spring, is performed upon the streets of the town. This is a morning ritual that is traditionally more boisterous than the dance. It is a moving street theatre that appears to have its origins in the Middle Ages, and the themes tend to be more English than uniquely Cornish. The theatre consists of the Hal-an-tow song accompanied by dancing and acting out the content of the verses. The costumes and the song itself represent many different historical and mythical themes. It has evolved over time, the most recent verse (about St Piran) only appeared within the 21st century.

=== Hellys International Guitar Festival ===
In 2017, a new festival was established by the lutenist Ben Salfield and his promoters, Kernow Concerts, bringing international concert artists from the world of guitar music from as far away as Los Angeles to perform concerts and give free lessons in Helston each August. The festival is initially based in The Old Cattle Market, next to Coronation Park and Boating Lake, and features some of the best artists in their field.

=== Helston Town Band ===
Helston Town Band has a rich history, which can be traced back to the turn of the 20th century. Indeed, there are members of the current band whose family connections extend back four generations. Inevitably, during the War the band reformed with new members and in 1946 numbers were consolidated when most of its pre-war members returned from active service. The band enjoyed steady progress at this time, which culminated in 1951 when it reached the National Third Section Finals at Belle Vue, Manchester.

In 1967, the band came under the direction of Edward Ashton, with whom the band gained much success and a reputation for consistently playing music to a high standard. Edward led the band to numerous successes in both local and regional contests, until his retirement in November 2002 after 35 years.

Following his retirement, the band appointed John Hitchens as their new musical director . The band has continued to flourish under John's direction: in 2003, they were crowned Cornish First Section Champions, and in 2004 they gained promotion to the National First Section.

In 2006, the band were crowned West of England First Section Champions, and received an invitation to compete in the National First Section Finals in Harrogate, where they achieved a commendable seventh place. The band went on to achieve third place at the West of England First Section Championships in 2007, and were delighted to become West of England First Section Champions once again in 2008.

These excellent results meant that Helston Town Band earned promotion and competed in the Championship Section in 2009 for the first time in its history.

== Churches and places of interest ==
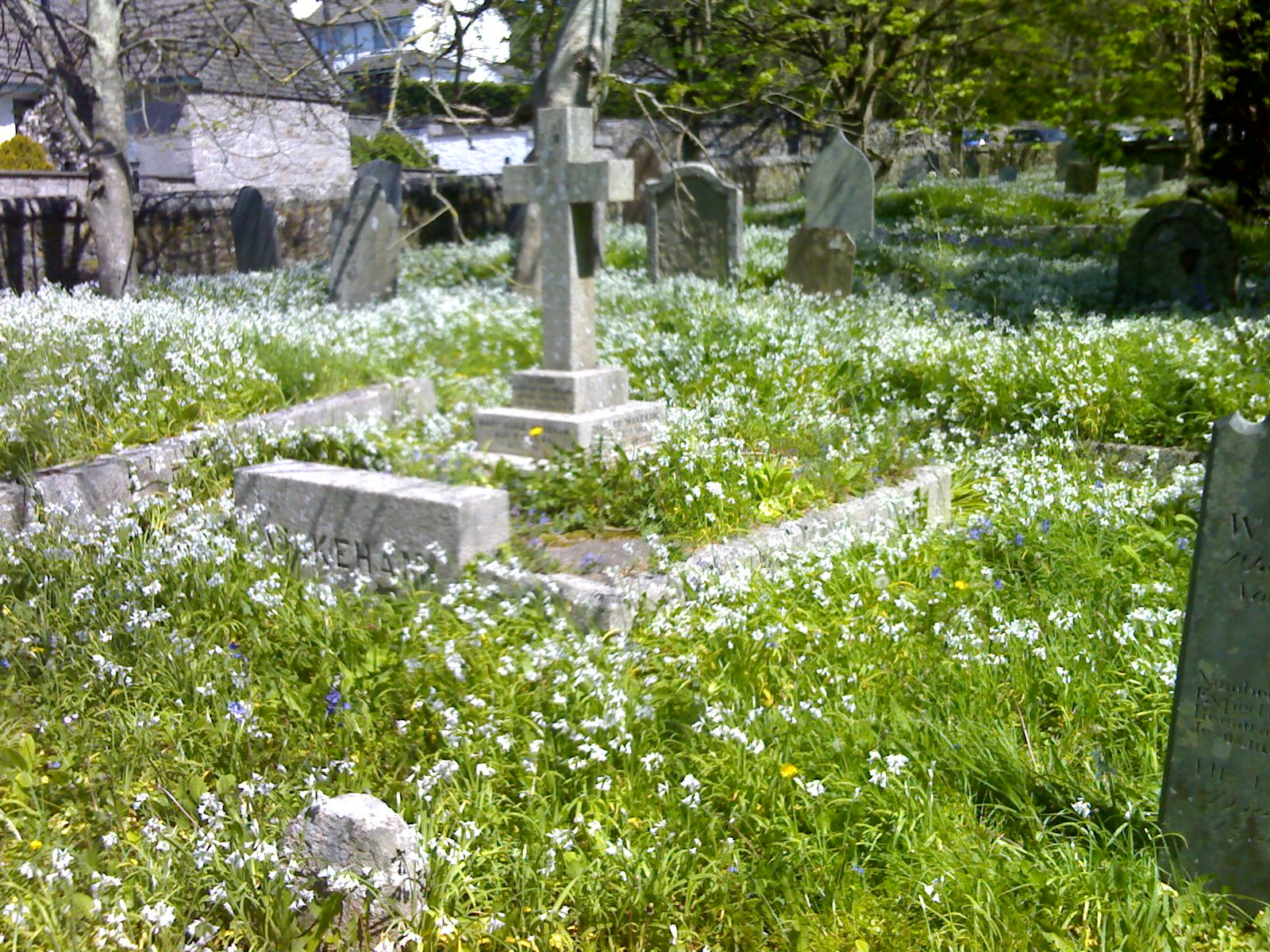
St Michael's churchyard

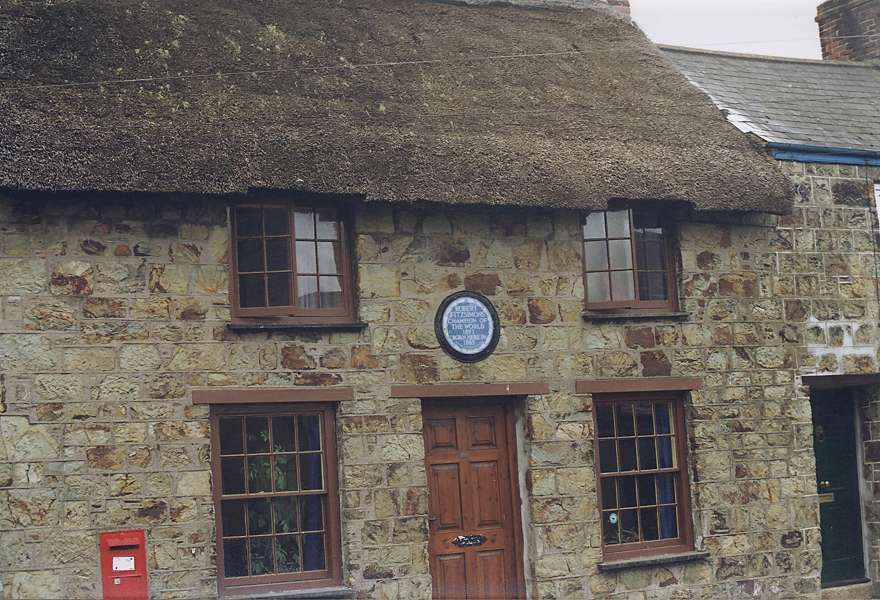
The birthplace of Bob Fitzsimmons

There are several churches, including St Michael's Church, a humble church with stained-glass windows and a tall bell tower which can be heard throughout the town. In the surrounding graveyard there is a monument to Henry Trengrouse, the inventor of the rocket fired safety line — a device for aiding in the saving of lives in a shipwreck.

Helston is also the birthplace of Bob "Ruby Robert" Fitzsimmons, the first triple world boxing champion. The house where he was born and lived in Helston is still standing and is indicated by a plaque above the door.

The Helston Museum, founded in 1949, occupies the building originally designed as the town's Market House in 1837, with two separate buildings—one for butter and eggs, the other the meat market. The exhibits are mostly concerned with Helston's agricultural and market town history. The museum also hosts art exhibitions and has a shop selling all things Cornish.

There are three Cornish crosses in Helston: one in Cross Street and two in Mr. Baddeley's garden (Cross Street). One of the latter crosses was removed from Tresprison, Wendron, and other from near Trelill Holy Well, Wendron. The cross from Trelill has ornament on the front and back of the shaft.

The Grylls Monument, at the end of Coinagehall Street was built by public subscription in 1834 to thank Humphry Millet Grylls, a local banker, who stopped the closure of Wheal Vor, a local mine that at the time employed over a thousand people.

Helston also hosted The Flambards Experience, formerly the Helston Aero Park, which was a theme park with a selection of rides together with a few remaining aviation exhibits. It closed down in 2024 after visitor numbers dwindled after COVID along with rising costs. Nearby Wendron is home to the Poldark Mine theme park, where visitors can go underground into the old workings. The Helston Railway, which aims to restore the Helston Branch, is also nearby.

== Schools ==
Helston Community College has the most pupils in Cornwall. Its South Site building was formerly (1939–1972) Helston Grammar School. Formerly located at Penrose Road (which became the secondary modern school), the grammar school had a long history dating back to the 16th century. Derwent Coleridge was a headmaster there, and his pupils included Charles Kingsley, John Duke Coleridge, Richard Edmonds, Thomas Rowe Edmonds, John Rogers, Henry Trengrouse and James Trevenen. Another former headmaster was the botanist and author Charles Alexander Johns (1843–47), who was also a former pupil.

The School Houses in grammar school days were Coleridge, Kingsley and Tennyson. Alfred Tennyson's local connection was through his writing.

Helston has three primary schools. These are Parc Eglos, St. Michael's and Nansloe. The catchment area of Helston Community College includes these and many other schools from the surrounding villages. There is also a primary school at Trannack. All three primary schools dance on Flora Day, as does Helston Community College.

== Media ==
Local TV coverage is provided by BBC South West and ITV West Country. Television signals are received from the Redruth and local relay transmitters.

Local radio stations are BBC Radio Cornwall, Heart West, Greatest Hits Radio South West, Pirate FM and Coast FM, a community based station.

Helston is served by two local paid-for newspapers, The West Briton and The Packet: both offer a selection of news and local pictures. The area is also covered by a free delivered newspaper, the Helston Advertiser established in April 2000.

Helston featured as the location for the 1996 Gremlin Interactive Windows PC title Realms of the Haunting.

== Sport and recreation ==
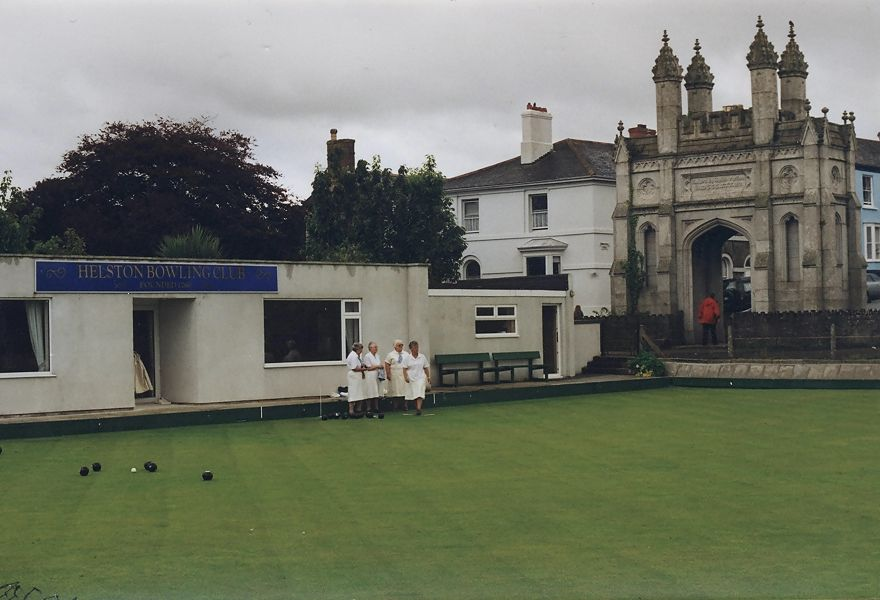
Bowling club and the Grylls Monument

In 1885, the annual custom of the beating the Helston Borough Bounds was undertaken, followed by a scrimmage for 15 dozen buns and the throwing of the hurling ball. In the same year Helston Cycling Club had their headquarters at the Globe Hotel and had a weekly evening cycle to places such as Redruth and the Lizard.

The town has an active sporting scene, with Helston RFC, Helston Athletic FC and Helston Cricket Club all having prominent roles within the community. The current rugby club was formed in 1965 but rugby was played on Helston Downs as early as 1883 when Helston beat Lanner by 6 tries and 3 touch-downs in self-defence to nil. The Swallows Gymnastics Club is also extremely popular within the area. Helston holds an annual road race An Resek Helys (The Race for Helston) and an annual triathlon.

The town has a King George V Playing Field, the home ground for the rugby club and finish line of An Resek Helys. Below the town is Coronation Park which has a man-made lake as its centrepiece where rowing boats can be hired in summer. A skate park is nearby in the same complex. The Penrose Amenity Area lies across the road from Coronation Park. National Trust-owned, this area, once part of the Penrose Estate, offers walks alongside the River Cober which leads down to Loe Pool and the sea beyond Loe Bar. Just off the main path is a bird-watching hide offering views over Loe Pool.

=== Cornish wrestling ===
Helston has been a centre for Cornish wrestling for centuries. Over this time there were a large number of sites where tournaments were held. These include: the Helston Downs, Gweal Folds farm, the Lower Green which became Coronation Park where tournaments continued to be held, Field near While Hill, Meneage Street, Bullock Lane, Coronation Park, Monument Road, Field at the rear of the Angel Hotel which became the Sunken Gardens where tournaments continued to be held, Grange Road and Penrose Amenity Area.

== Notable people ==
- William Jordan (fl. 1611), Cornish dramatist, lived locally, may have written the Cornish language mystery or sacred drama Gwreans an Bys: the Creacon of the World.
- Charles Abbot, 1st Baron Colchester (1757–1829), barrister, local MP and statesman, Speaker of the House of Commons between 1802 and 1817.
- Davies Gilbert (1767–1839), from St Erth, engineer, author, politician and local MP.
- Henry Trengrouse (1772–1854), an inventor who invented the "Rocket" lifesaving apparatus.
- John Rogers (1778–1856), Anglican priest, mine-owner, botanist, mineralogist, scholar of Hebrew and Syriac; died locally
- John Bryant Lane (1788–1868), a Cornish painter.
- Sir Richard Vyvyan, 8th Baronet (1800–1879) from Trelowarren, landowner, politician and local MP, from 1841 to 1857.
- Caroline Billin Currie (1849–1940), an English miniature-painter and fore-edge painter
- Sir Thomas Henry Holland (1868–1947), geologist and director of the Geological Survey of India from 1903 to 1910
- W. H. Cock (1873–1938), clergyman, novelist and writer. He argued for humane treatment of animals
- A. R. Middleton Todd (1891–1966), artist and portrait painter, member of the Royal Academy.
- Daphne McClure (1927–2023), artist, notable for her paintings of her native Cornwall.
- Jon Cruddas (born 1962), politician and MP for Dagenham and Rainham between 2001 and 2024; born locally.

=== Sport ===
- Bob Fitzsimmons (1863–1917), professional boxer who was the sport's first three-division world champion and the lightest heavyweight champion
- Mike Tiddy (1929–2009), football player and manager; played over 400 games, player-manager of Helston Athletic
- Piran Holloway (born 1970), first-class cricket wicket-keeper, played 128 games for Warwickshire and Somerset.

== Twinning ==
Helston is twinned with the following towns:

- Plougasnou, Brittany, France
- Sasso Marconi, Bologna, Italy.
