= French ship Mutine =

Twelve ships of the French Navy have borne the name Mutine ("Mischievous" (Note: "Mutine" is the feminine form of "mutin". The same word also means "mutineer".)):

== Ships ==
- French frigate Mutine (1670), a 14-gun frigate
- French frigate Mutine (1675), an experimental armoured ship
- French frigate Mutine (1676), a 28-gun Fée-class light frigate.
- French ship Mutine (1695), a 40-gun ship of the line.
- French frigate Mutine (1745), a 24-gun Galathée-class frigate.
- French ship Mutine (1794), a 12-gun Belliqueuse-class gun-brig.
- French ship Mutine (1797), an Henriette-class gunboat.
- French corvette Mutine (1799), an 18-gun corvette, lead ship of her two-vessel class. HMS Racoon destroyed her near Santiago de Cuba on 17 August 1803.
- French brig Mutine (1824), a Rose-class brig-schooner.
- French gunboat Mutine (1885), an Alerte-class steamer gunboat.
- French ship Estoc (1901), a hulk, was named Mutine during her career.
- French patrol boat Mutine (1945), a patrol boat on Lake Constance, captured from the Germans.

== See also ==
- French ship Mutin

== Notes and references ==
=== Bibliography ===
- Roche, Jean-Michel (2005). Dictionnaire des bâtiments de la flotte de guerre française de Colbert à nos jours. Vol. 1. Group Retozel-Maury Millau. pp. 319–320. ISBN 978-2-9525917-0-6. OCLC 165892922.
- Roche, Jean-Michel (2005). Dictionnaire des bâtiments de la flotte de guerre française de Colbert à nos jours. Vol. 2. Group Retozel-Maury Millau. p. 356. ISBN 978-2-9525917-0-6. OCLC 165892922.
