= James Gordon (Royal Navy officer) =

Royal Navy officer (1782–1869)

Admiral of the Fleet Sir James Gordon GCB
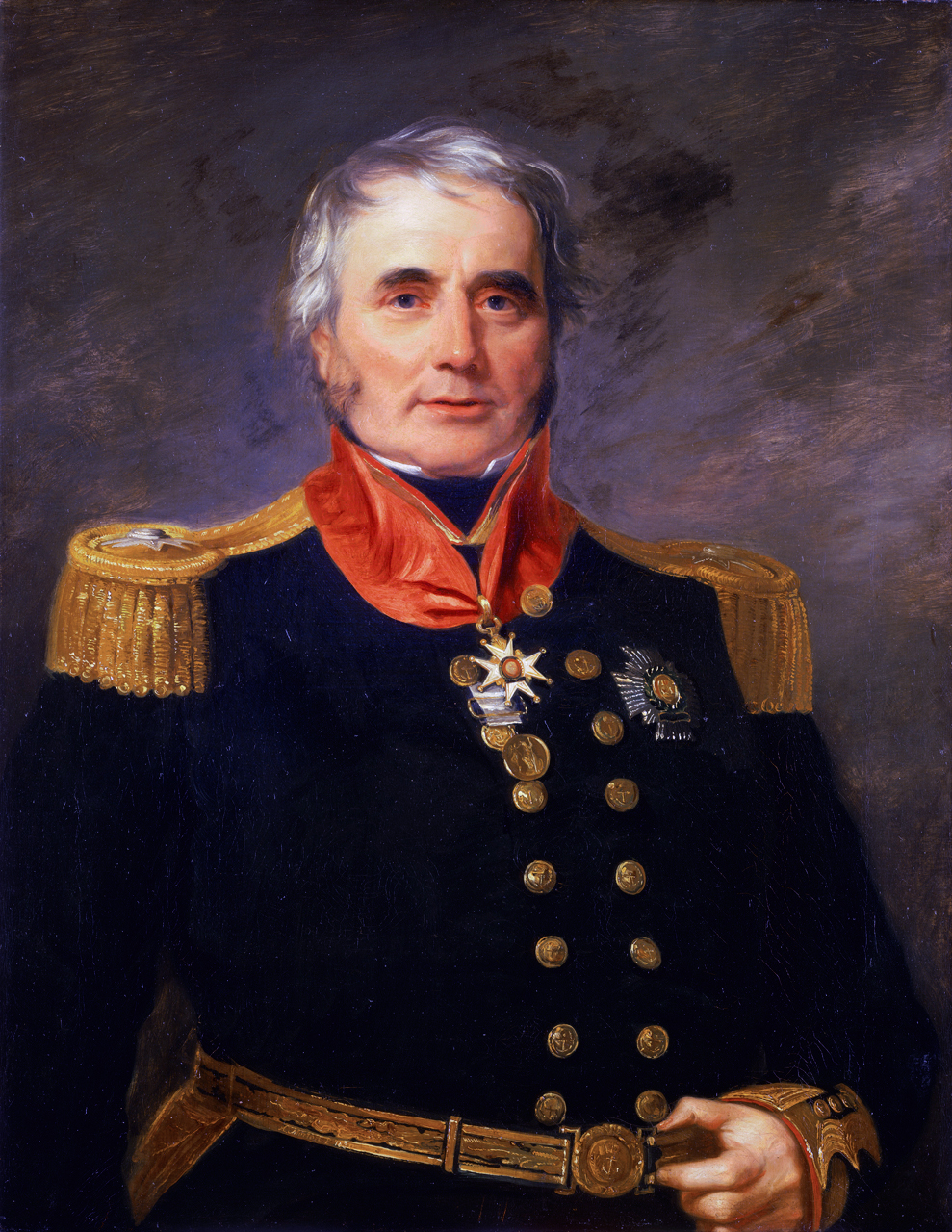
- Portrait by Andrew Morton, 1839
- Born: 6 October 1782; Kildrummy, Aberdeenshire
- Died: 8 January 1869 (aged 86); Greenwich, London
- Military career
- Allegiance: Great Britain; United Kingdom
- Branch: Royal Navy
- Service years: 1793–1869
- Rank: Admiral of the Fleet
- Nickname: Last of Nelson's Captains
- Commands: HMS Racoon; HMS Ligaera; HMS Mercury; HMS Active; HMS Seahorse; HMS Madagascar; HMS Maeander; Victualling Board; Naval Hospital, Plymouth; Chatham Dockyard; Greenwich Hospital
- Conflicts: French Revolutionary Wars; Napoleonic Wars; War of 1812
- Awards: Knight Grand Cross of the Order of the Bath

Admiral of the Fleet Sir James Alexander Gordon, GCB (6 October 1782 – 8 January 1869) was a Royal Navy officer. As a volunteer, he fought at the Battle of Groix, at the Battle of the Glorious First of June and at the Battle of Cape St Vincent during the French Revolutionary Wars and then, as a midshipman, served under Admiral Sir Horatio Nelson at the Battle of the Nile.

Gordon became commanding officer of the 28-gun frigate HMS Mercury which took part of a hard-fought action between three British ships and the combined forces of a Spanish convoy, 20 gunboats and land artillery off the town of Rota during the Napoleonic Wars. He later became captain of the 38-gun frigate HMS Active which was one of the four ships that defeated a much larger French squadron at the first Battle of Lissa and was one of three that subsequently defeated three more powerful French frigates off Palagruža.

Gordon also saw action in the War of 1812 leading the successful raid on Alexandria on the Potomac and taking part in the less successful attack on Fort McHenry and the Battle of Baltimore. He went on to be Governor of Greenwich Hospital.

== Early career ==
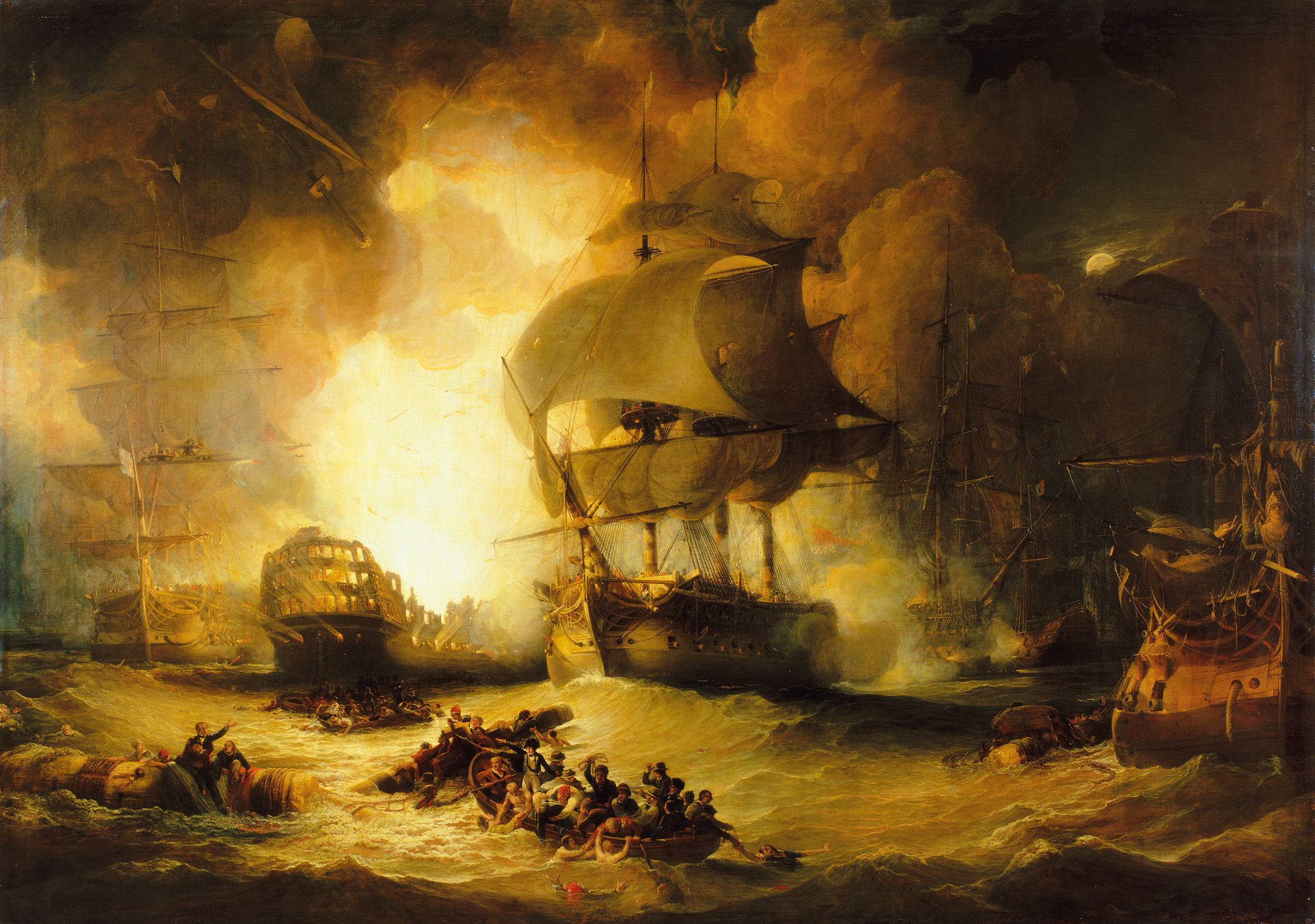
The Battle of the Nile at which Gordon was present as a volunteer

Born the eldest son of Charles Gordon of Wardhouse, Aberdeenshire, and his wife, a daughter of Major James Mercer, of Auchnacant, Aberdeenshire, Gordon joined the Royal Navy in November 1793. He was assigned to the 74-gun HMS Arrogant in the Channel Squadron, took part in the blockade of Brest and served under Lord Howe at the Battle of the Glorious First of June in June 1794. He spent time on harbour duty in the 74-gun HMS Invincible, in the 74-gun HMS Ramillies, the 74-gun HMS Defence and finally the 24-gun HMS Eurydice during 1794. He transferred to the frigate HMS Révolutionnaire in 1795 and served under Admiral Lord Bridport at the Battle of Groix in June 1795 during the French Revolutionary Wars.

Gordon moved to the 90-gun ship-of-the-line HMS Namur in 1796. He transferred to the 74-gun HMS Goliath and served under Sir John Jervis at the Battle of Cape St Vincent in February 1797 and, having been promoted to midshipman, he served under Admiral Sir Horatio Nelson at the Battle of the Nile in August 1798 when a crushing defeat was inflicted on the French fleet commanded by François-Paul Brueys d'Aigalliers. He became second lieutenant of the sloop Bordelais in January 1800 and, while escorting a convoy to the West Indies, fought an action with three French brigs, capturing one in January 1801. In the Caribbean later that year Gordon, on an independent mission, was captured by the Haitian government of Toussaint Louverture and spent four months in prison before being released by cartel. He was made first lieutenant of the 18-gun brig HMS Racoon in 1802 and returned to the West Indies. Racoon's capture of the French corvette Lodi in July 1803 led to Gordon's appointment as commanding officer of HMS Raccoon in October 1803 and his promotion to commander on 2 March 1804.

== Frigate captain ==
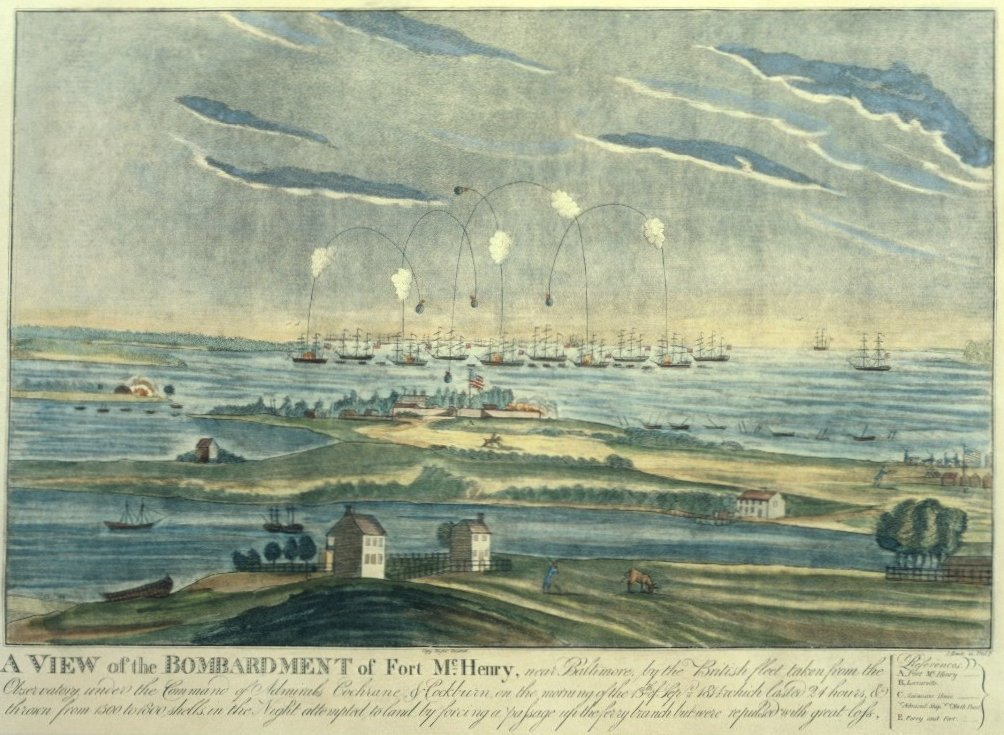
The attack on Fort McHenry in which Gordon took part as commodore

Gordon was promoted to post-captain on 16 May 1805 and assigned command of the 28-gun frigate HMS Ligaera but shortly after his arrival in England was taken seriously ill and had to resign his command. He was without a command until 1807, when he took over the 28-gun frigate HMS Mercury, engaged in blockade duties off Cádiz, and took part of a hard-fought action between three British ships and the combined forces of a Spanish convoy, 20 gunboats and land artillery off the town of Rota in April 1808.

He became captain of the 38-gun frigate HMS Active at Gibraltar in June 1808 and spent the next three years in operations in the Mediterranean Sea and Adriatic Sea. Active was one of the four ships under the command of William Hoste that successfully defeated a much larger French squadron at the first Battle of Lissa in March 1811 and she was one of three that defeated three more powerful French frigates off Palagruža in November 1811. In this latter action Gordon's left knee was shattered by a cannonball and his leg had to be amputated; he used a wooden leg for the remainder of his life. He recuperated in Malta and was able to take Active back to England in June 1812.

He took command of the frigate HMS Seahorse in September 1812, escorting convoys for the West Indies and enforcing the blockade of France. In 1814 she transferred to the American station, where the War of 1812 was still under way. Gordon, with Charles Napier as his second in command, distinguished himself as commodore leading the successful raid on Alexandria on the Potomac in August 1814 and also taking part in the less successful attack on Fort McHenry and the Battle of Baltimore in September 1814.

Thereafter, he served off the Gulf Coast, and commanded a squadron of vessels near Pensacola, Florida. He went on to provide logistic support during the Battle of New Orleans in January 1815. He was appointed a Knight Commander of the Order of the Bath on 29 June 1815.

Gordon continued to hold seagoing commands after the cessation of hostilities, becoming commanding officer of the frigate HMS Madagascar on the Home Station in November 1815 and then of the frigate HMS Maeander in October 1816. He rejoined his old command, HMS Active, in 1819 and was again her commanding officer until 1821. After this he held no further seagoing command. He was appointed Superintendent of the Naval Hospital at Plymouth in 1828 and moved on to become Superintendent of Chatham Dockyard in July 1832. From 1827 to 1832 he served as a Commissioner of the Victualling Board.

== Senior command ==
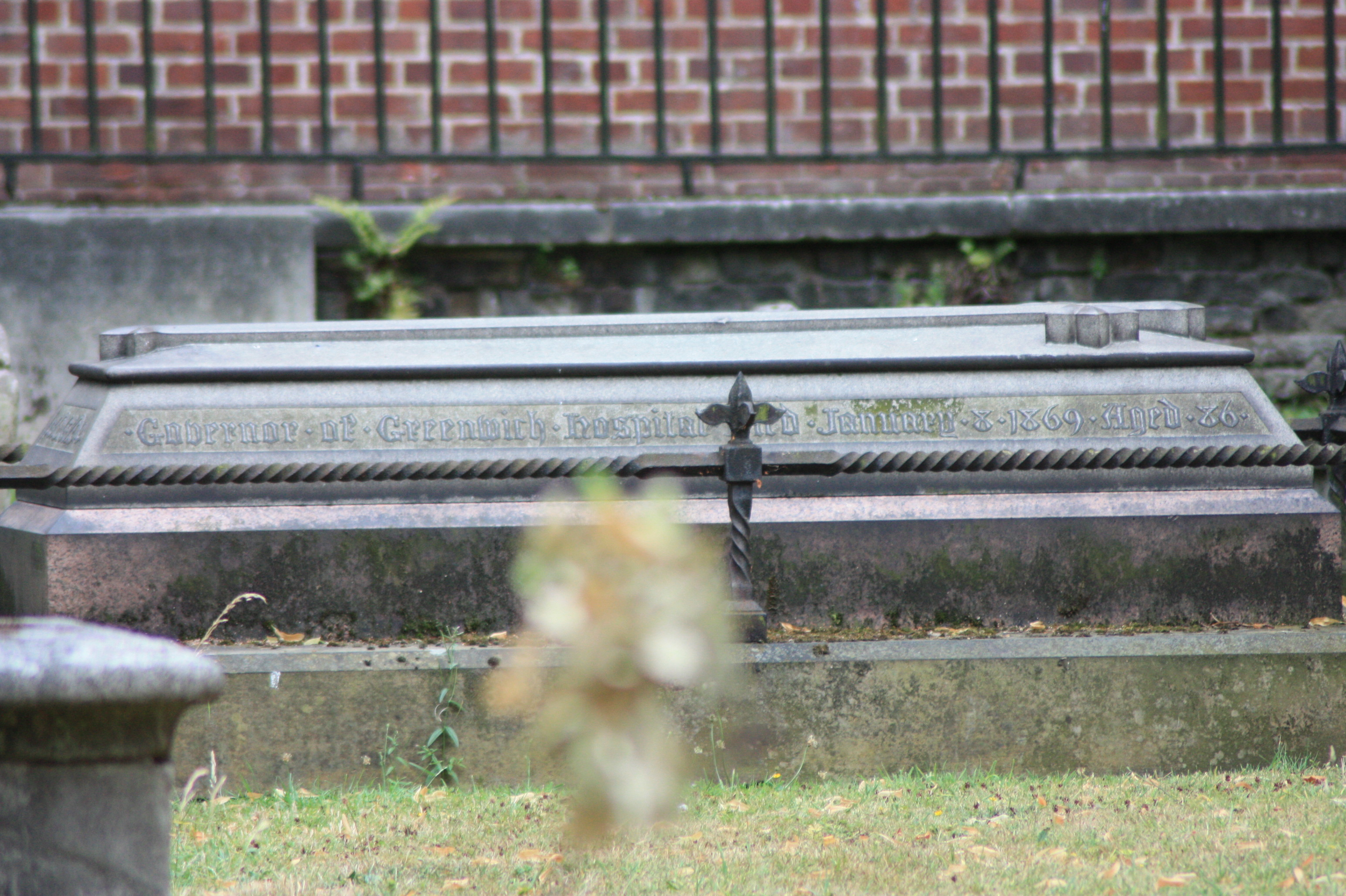
Gordon's grave at Greenwich Hospital

Promoted to rear-admiral on 10 January 1837, Gordon became Lieutenant-Governor of the Greenwich Hospital at Greenwich in July 1840. Promoted to vice-admiral on 8 January 1848, he succeeded Sir Charles Adam as Governor of Greenwich Hospital in October 1853. He was promoted to full admiral on 21 January 1854 and, having been advanced to Knight Grand Cross of the Order of the Bath on 5 July 1855, he was promoted to Admiral of the Fleet on 30 January 1868.

== Death ==
Gordon died at Greenwich Hospital on 8 January 1869 and was buried in the hospital grounds. The grave lies within an enclosed area of surviving graves within the generally cleared graveyard, now forming a pocket park immediately west of the entrance to National Maritime Museum.

An obituary in Macmillan’s Magazine hailed him as "The Last of Nelson’s Captains" and a biography by Bryan Perrett argued that his career was the principal model for that of C. S. Forester's hero Horatio Hornblower.

== Family ==
In August 1812 Gordon married Lydia Ward; they had seven daughters and one son.

== See also ==
- O'Byrne, William Richard (1849). "Gordon, James Alexander (a)" . A Naval Biographical Dictionary . John Murray – via Wikisource.

== Sources ==
- Heathcote, Tony (2002). The British Admirals of the Fleet 1734 – 1995. Pen & Sword. ISBN 0-85052-835-6.
- Perrett, Bryan (1998). The Real Hornblower: The Life and Times of Admiral Sir James Gordon, GCB. Pen & Sword Maritime. ISBN 978-1781591956.

Military offices
Preceded by Sir Charles Adam	Governor, Greenwich Hospital; 1853–1869	Succeeded by Sir Houston Stewart
