= French ship Mutin =

Four ships of the French Navy have bourne the name of Mutin ("mutinous", or "joker"):

== Ships ==
- French cutter Mutin (1778), a 14-gun cutter, lead ship of her class.
- French cutter Passe-Partout (1845), a 4-gun cutter.
- French ship Mutin (1883), a school cutter.
- French cutter Mutin (A652), a school cutter of the French Navy presently in service.
Ships of the French Navy named Mutin
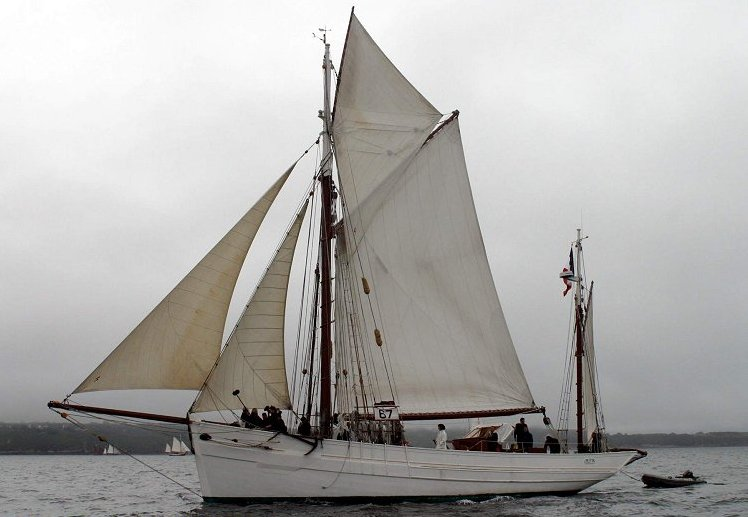
The school cutter Mutin (A652)

== See also ==
- French ship Mutine
