= HMS Racoon (1795) =

Brig-sloop of the Royal Navy

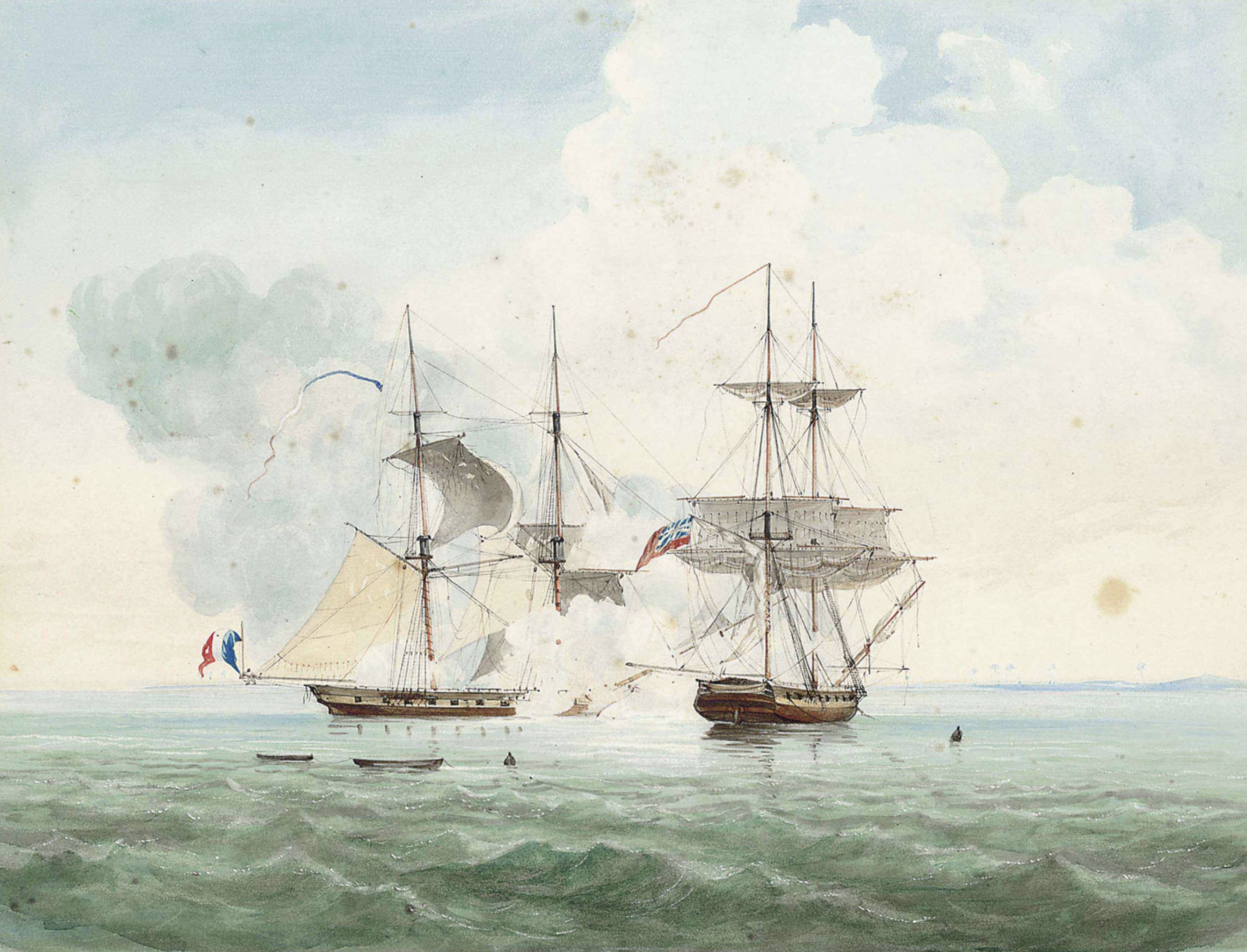
- Racoon (right) at the action of 11 July 1803

History

Great Britain
- Name: HMS Racoon
- Namesake: Raccoon
- Ordered: 13 July 1795
- Builder: John Randall, Rotherhithe
- Laid down: July 1795
- Launched: 14 October 1795
- Fate: Broken up 1806

General characteristics
- Class & type: Diligence-class brig-sloop
- Type: 18-gun Brig-sloop
- Tons burthen: 317 27/94 (bm)
- Length: 95 ft 1 in (29.0 m) (overall); 75 ft 2 1/4 in (22.9 m) (keel)
- Beam: 22 ft 2 in (6.8 m)
- Draught: Unladen: 6 ft 4 in (1.9 m); Laden: 10 ft 3 in (3.1 m)
- Depth of hold: 12 ft 1 in (3.7 m)
- Propulsion: Sails
- Sail plan: Brig
- Complement: 121
- Armament: 16 × 32-pounder carronades; 2 × 6-pounder bow chasers

HMS Racoon (or Raccoon) was a brig-sloop built and launched in 1795. She served during the French Revolutionary Wars and in the beginning of the Napoleonic Wars. She had an active career under several captains, working essentially independently while capturing or destroying some 20 enemy privateers and naval vessels. Several of the captures involved engagements that resulted in casualties on Racoon as well as on her opponents. She was broken up early in 1806.

== Design ==
The Diligence class were built to a design by John Henslow. They were quickly ordered and built, with the last three, including Racoon, being built of fir (pine), which made for quicker construction, but at the price of durability.

== French Revolutionary Wars ==
=== Commander Henry Raper ===
The Racoon was commissioned in November 1795 under Commander Henry Raper. In March, Commander Edward Roe replaced Raper.

=== Commander Edward Roe ===
In April 1796, Racoon, under Captain Edward Roe, captured the French privateer lugger Furet with a crew of 13 men armed with blunderbusses and muskets. The privateer had been out of Dunkirk five days but had captured nothing. On 29 April Racoon recaptured the Sincerity, John Ingham, master, which a rowboat privateer had captured. Racoon sent Sincerity, of Guernsey, into The Downs. Then on 19 July Racoon captured the Aurora.

Roe and Racoon were off Dungeness on 29 September when they captured the French privateer cutter Actif. Actif was armed with six 3-pounder guns and several swivel guns and had a crew of 23 men. Actif was one day out of Boulogne and had taken nothing, but was in the process of boarding a vessel when Racoon arrived.

Racoon also shared in the capture of two more privateers, Furet and Hazard. The sloop Fly captured the French privateer lugger Furet of five swivels and 27 men, on 22 August, seven leagues from the Isle of Portland. The armed cutter Lion captured the French privateer cutter Hazard, of two guns and two swivels, off the Owers on 14 December 1796. Hazard and her crew of 17 men had been out from Fecamp for two days but had captured nothing. (Note: A prize money announcement in the London Gazette gives the captors of Furet and Hazard as the cutters Ann and George, and the dates as 21 April and 24 May 1796. However, there are no other supporting, longer accounts of the actual captures.)

=== Commander Robert Lloyd ===
In December 1796 Commander Robert Lloyd assumed command of Racoon. He was already captain on 16 December when she captured the galiot Concordia. Eurydice, Fairy, and hired armed cutter Grace were in sight. Racoon and Harpy were in company when they captured the Hoop.

Racoon was some five or six leagues SSW of Fairlight at 1 a.m. on 20 April 1797 when she encountered a cutter to which she gave chase. At 3 a.m. Racoon captured the French privateer Les Amis, which was armed with two 4-pounder guns and six swivels, and had a crew of 31 men. Les Amis had left Boulogne at 7 p.m. the evening before and had captured one vessel. Racoon was able to recapture the prize, Good Intent, James Marshall, master, as well. Racoon shared the capture and recapture with Grace. On 15 November, Racoon and Grace recaptured the cutter Mary.

On 11 January 1798, Racoon was seven leagues south-west of Beachy Head when she encountered a cutter. Racoon gave chase and after a running fight of two hours captured the French privateer Policrate. Policrate was armed with 16 guns (of which she threw five overboard during the chase), and had a crew of 72 men. She was an entirely new vessel that had left Dunkirk for the West Indies. Grapeshot from Policrate's stern chase guns and small arms fire killed Racoon's master, and wounded four men, two severely.

Eleven days later, again off Beachy Head, Racoon captured the French privateer schooner Pensėe, of two 4-pounder guns and nine swivel guns. Pensėe had a crew of 32 men and had left Dieppe a few days earlier but had not captured anything.

Racoon captured another privateer on 20 October, but it sank shortly after capture. Racoon was about three leagues NW by W of Blackness at 6 a.m. when she sighted three luggers ahead. She immediately sailed towards them and after a two-hour running fight was able to capture one. The captive was the Vigilante, of twelve 4-pounder and two 6-pounder guns. She had a crew of some 50 men on board, all under the command of Citizen Muirbassse. When the prize crew went on board Vigilante they found that he was taking on water rapidly due to shot holes in her hull. Racoon tried to stop the leaks, which took up so much time that the other two privateers were able to make their escape. Lloyd was able to get all his prisoners aboard Racoon, leaving only the dead behind, and watched Valiante sink at 9 a.m. Valiante was new and had been out only once before and had not captured anything. One of the luggers that escaped had taken a prize that another British warship recaptured two hours later.

On 1 July 1799, Racoon recaptured the West Indiaman Benjamin and Elizabeth, which had been sailing from Grenada to London, and which two French privateers had just captured. Benjamin and Elizabeth was about four leagues off Dungeness during a foggy night, when two French privateer luggers came up and boarded her. The captain, mate, and two seaman resisted but were overwhelmed. The privateers threw the captain overboard, though he was already severely wounded. One lugger picked him up. The privateers also shot the mate and one seaman at point-blank range after they were already wounded and had surrendered (both were expected to survive). Racoon, which had been escorting the West India convoy, heard the shooting and came up after the privateer vessels had left. She was able to recapture Benjamin and Elizabeth within minutes. Shortly afterwards the fog cleared slightly and Racoon saw the privateers, one of which was about 3-400 yards away. Racoon immediately fired a broadside, and when the smoke cleared, the lugger had disappeared completely, apparently sunk. The second privateer disappeared as the fog came back in.

Then on the morning of 2 December Racoon was WSW of Portee when she encountered a French lugger. After an hour's chase Racoon captured her quarry, which proved to be the Vrai Decide, of 14 guns and four swivel guns. Vrai Decide had 41 men on board, under the command of Citizen Defgardi. The lugger was from Boulogne, had been out 30 hours in company with three other privateers, and had taken no prizes. Cormorant was in sight and joined the chase.

The next day, Racoon captured another privateer, in this case after a fight. At 10 p.m. Racoon was about five or six miles south of Dover when she sighted a lugger boarding a brig. Racoon set off in pursuit and after 40 minutes of a running fight came alongside and exchanged further fire with the quarry. The French vessel sustained so much damage that he had to strike. The privateer was the Intrepide, of 16 guns and 60 men under the command of Citizen Suillard. He had sailed from Boulogne at 4 p.m. the previous day. In the engagement the French had thirteen men killed and wounded; Racoon had two men slightly wounded, one of them being Lloyd, who was wounded in the head by a half-pike, though not dangerously. Racoon was too damaged for Lloyd to be able to pursue the brig the privateer had captured. The brig was the Welcombe, and she had been sailing from London to Plymouth with malt. Lloyd stated that he "derived particular Pleasure to have deprived the Enemy of a Vessel which they considered the largest and best Sailer from Calais".

Two days later Lloyd received his promotion to post captain. His replacement, in December, was Commander Wilson Rathborne (sometimes reported as "Rathbone").

=== Commander William Rathborne ===
On 2 September 1800, Racoon arrived at Portsmouth with 170 kegs of liquor that she had picked up at sea. Then one month later, on 3 October, Racoon brought into Portsmouth a smuggler that she had captured off Beachy Head. Raccoon, under "Wilson Rathborne", then recaptured the Portland on 30 November.

In November 1801 Rathborne convoyed the Straits fleet to Gibraltar, arriving there on 16 November. On the way they encountered dreadful weather in the Bay of Biscay. While Racoon was near Brest, she observed Hannibal, which the French had captured at the Battle of Algeciras Bay on 5 July 1801, and Speedy, which the French had captured two days earlier in a separate engagement. Both former Royal Navy vessels were under jury-masts and French colours.

By early February 1802 Racoon was at Malta. From there she sent a letter reporting that the sloop Mondovi had arrived there with the news that the Turks and Mamelukes were at war in upper Egypt, with heavy casualties on both sides. On 2 July Racoon returned to Portsmouth from Malta, via Gibraltar. She left Portsmouth about three weeks later with a squadron to sail to Lymington and Jersey, to convey Dutch troops there to Cuxhaven. She was back at Plymouth by 1 September. On 22 October, Racoon received orders to sail immediately to the West Indies.

Rathborne then sailed her to Jamaica. He was promoted in Jamaica from Racoon to post captain, with the promotion being dated 18 October 1802.

== Napoleonic Wars ==
=== Commander Austin Bissell ===
In 1803 Commander Austin Bissell took command of Racoon. Between 5 July 1803 and 10 July she captured or destroyed four French vessels:

- 6 July: schooner at anchor in bay near Cape Rosa, sunk;
- 7 July: Schooner Vertu, of two guns, carrying troops and provisions from Port-au-Prince, taken;
- 7 July: Sloop L'Ami des Colonies, of two guns, taken;
- 9 July: Schooner run on shore and sunk in Barradier Bay.

Then, within about a month Racoon participated in two single-ship actions. First, on 11 July 1803, Racoon was sailing between Guanaba and St. Domingo when she sighted a French naval brig anchored in Léogâne Roads. As Racoon sailed towards her Bissell saw that the French had springs on their cables and were ready to engage. At 2:45 p.m. Racoon anchored, also with springs, 30 yards from the brig. The two vessels exchanged fire for half an hour before the French vessel cut his cables and tried to sail away. Racoon followed and after about another 10 minutes of fire from Racoon, the French brig surrendered.

The Frenchman was the Lodi, pierced for 20 guns but with only 10 mounted, and under the command of Capitaine de fregate M. Pierre Isaac Taupier. The French had lost one man killed and 13 or 14 men wounded; Racoon had only one man wounded.

In August, Having received information that French privateers were operating out of Cuban ports, Bissell sailed along the east end of the Jamaican coast and then crossed to Santiago de Cuba. There he saw four schooners, which appeared to be armed. Within a few days Racoon was able to encounter three of them early in the morning. Racoon captured two after tedious chases, as they separated. They were the Deux Amis and the Trois Freres, both of three guns. Racoon was also able to drive the third, of two guns, on shore, where she was wrecked.

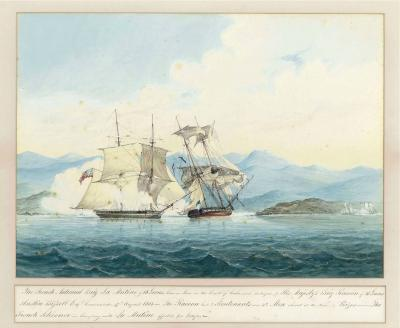
HMS Racoon engaging with French navy corvette Mutine, circle of William John Huggins

The second notable action occurred on 17 August off the coast of Cuba. At 1 p.m. Racoon sighted a brig coming along shore and that met up with a schooner that had been avoiding the British all day. At 3 p.m. the two came up together, but Racoon held back. Then at 4:15 the brig hoisted French colours and opened fire on Racoon. Racoon and the brig exchanged broadsides, with Racoon's fire bringing down most of the brig's rigging. The brig ran on shore on the rocks in a small bay, where she struck her colours. After some maneuvering, Racoon fired a broadside from her other side to try to destroy the brig. After about half an hour, the brig raised her colours again. Racoon made several passes, firing on the brig, which lost her mainmast near sunset, and fell on her side. The brig sent her crew ashore in boats while Racoon watched all night. In the morning it was clear that the brig was a complete wreck, having lost her masts and being full of water. Bissell decided not to permit Racoon's master to take a boat and some men to the brig to burn her because there were too many armed men on shore who would fire on any boarding party. Also, Racoon had her two lieutenants and 42 men away in the prizes she had taken the previous month.

The brig turned out to be the French navy's corvette Mutine, of eighteen 18-pounder guns. She had been full of men and had been sailing from Port-de-Paix to Santiago de Cuba. During the engagement, the schooner made her escape despite the efforts of Lieutenant Wright, in one of the prizes, to capture her. Mutine, under the command of lieutenant de vaisseau Reybaud, had sailed from Gibraltar and Malaga.

Between 13 and 14 October Racoon captured four French schooners and a cutter. The schooners were the Jeune Adelle and Liza, plus two others whose names were not recorded. The cutter was the Amitie, of four guns and six swivel guns. All were mostly in ballast, but also carrying some dry goods or ironmongery. Jeune Adele and Amitie (or Amelie) were part of a group of three naval vessels, including the brig Petite Fille.

On the afternoon of 13 October, Racoon had observed several vessels sail along the coast of Cuba and enter Cumberland Harbour before sunset. Bissell believed that they were French and part of the evacuation of Port-au-Prince. He anchored in a nearby small bay until morning. At 6:30 a.m. Racoon chased nine vessels, and came to engage a brig, schooner, and cutter. After a broadside or two from Racoon, the brig struck. Bissell sent aboard a small prize crew comprising an officer and some men and then turned his attention to the other two vessels. At 11 they approached Racoon with an intent to board. Bissell maneuvered Racoon to block this attempt and continued to engage the two with broadsides, receiving cannon and extensive small-arms fire in return. After about an hour Racoon had battered the cutter into a wreck. He had many casualties and struck. Bissell sent a prize crew to him, and then set off after the schooner, which had started to flee when the cutter struck. At 1 p.m., Racoon caught up with him, fired a few shot, and he too struck. Racoon then chased a brig, which proved to be American, before returning to the French brig that she had captured in the morning.

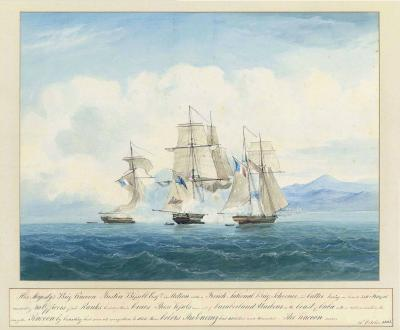
HMS Racoon capturing French schooner Jeune Adele and cutter Amelie, circle of William John Huggins

Bissell discovered that while Racoon was engaged the cutter and schooner, the Frenchmen on the brig Petite Fille had overpowered the prize crew Bissell had put aboard him and had run the brig onshore, where they escaped with their weapons. Petite Fille had been under the command of Lieutenant de Vaisseau M. Piquet (the elder), and had had on board 180 troops, in addition to crew. Bissell was able to recover his prize crew unharmed. Petite Fille had been stationed at Port-au-Prince, where she had carried supplies to Saint-Marc. When captured, she was evacuating troops and civilians from Port-au-Prince to Cuba. The British were able to refloat her and she was sold at Santiago de Cuba.

The schooner Jeune Adele was under the command of Lieutenant de Vaisseau M. Serin, and had 80 troops aboard. The cutter Amelie was under the command of Ensign de Vaisseau M. Puy and had on board over 70 troops.

The French commanders disclosed that they knew that Racoon was in the area and that the three French vessels had sortied from Cumberland Harbour with the intent to take Racoon by boarding, using their superiority in numbers. Bissell was of the opinion that had the wind remained as calm as it was early in the morning, they might have succeeded, though at great cost. As it was, the French had over forty dead and wounded. Racoon had only one man injured. Though Racoon had little damage, only some shot to her sails, Bissell returned to port, stating that "the very disabled State of the Prizes, and having expended nearly all the Shot on board, will, I hope, plead my excuse for returning to Port before I was regularly recalled." The Lloyd's Patriotic Fund awarded Bissell an honour sword worth 100 guineas. Head money for 37 men, pronounced to have been aboard the Amitiė, was paid in December 1824.

Soon after this Bissell received promotion to post captain and command of Creole, which the British had captured in July. (Note: Bissell sailed for Britain in December but on 2 January 1804 Creole foundered in the Atlantic on the way. Other vessels in the convoy saved him and all his crew, though he would die in 1807 when the 74-gun Blenheim (originally a 90-gun Second Rate), of which he was then captain, foundered in the Indian Ocean.) James Alexander Gordon, first lieutenant of Racoon, replaced Bissell on 22 October.

=== Commander James Alexander Gordon ===
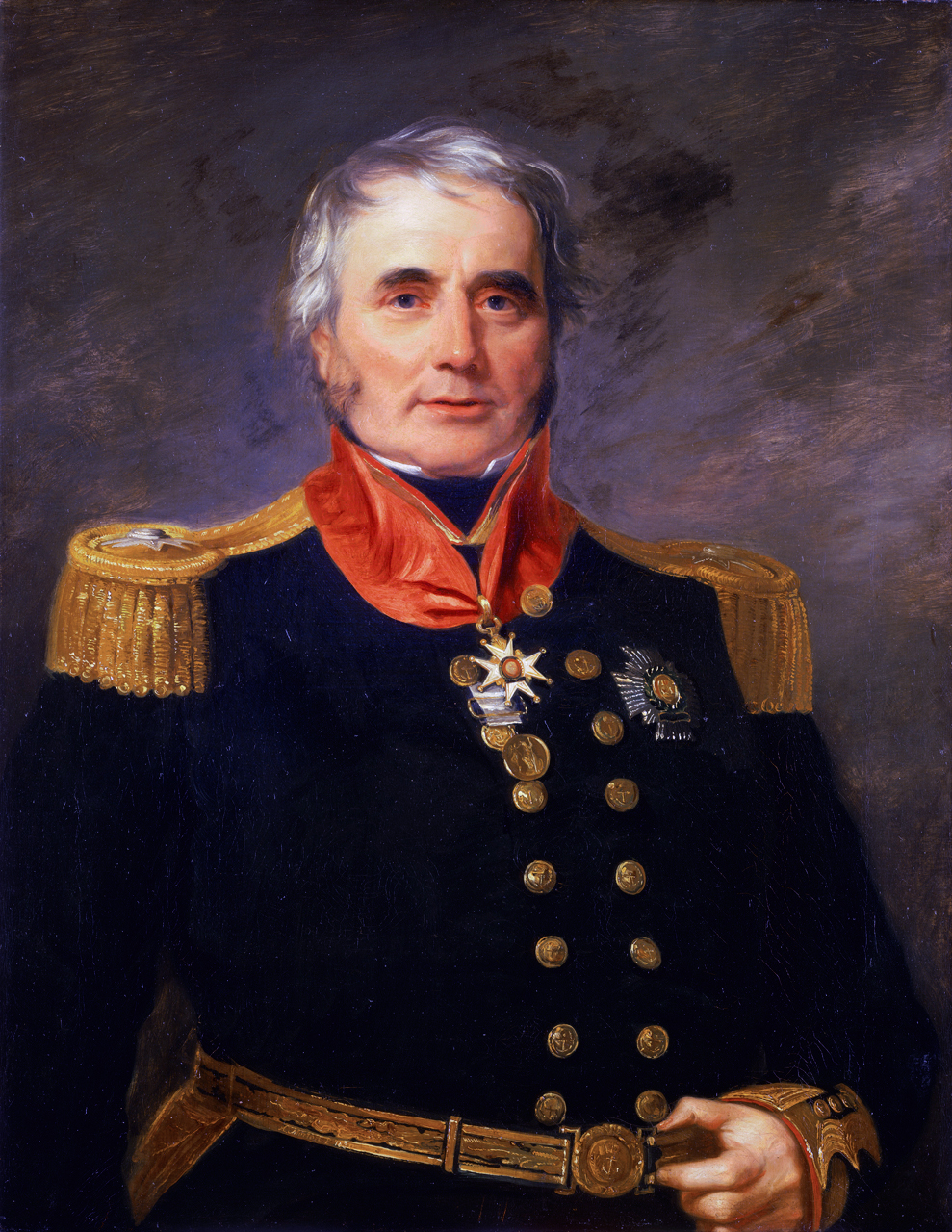
Rear Admiral Sir James Alexander Gordon, painted by Andrew Morton in 1839

Gordon was promoted to Commander in the Racoon on 3 March 1804. On 16 March 1804 Racoon captured the French navy transport Argo, of six guns and some 30 men, not including the 50 soldiers she was transporting. Argo was under the command of a Lieutenant de vaisseau, and was sailing in ballast. She was sailing from New Orleans to France, and had been out 22 days.

Two weeks later, on 2 April, Racoon captured the privateer felucca Jean Baptiste, of 28 men. Three days later, Racoon captured another privateer felucca, this the Aventure, of one gun and 28 men. At about the same time Racoon recaptured the Elizabeth.

On 1 August, seven or eight leagues from Sand Key, Gordon and Racoon were able to lure a large French privateer to within 3-400 yards. After Racoon had fired on the privateer for about three quarters of an hour she struck. The privateer was the Alliance, of 12 guns, but with only six mounted – four 6-pounder and two 9-pounders. She had a crew of 68 men under the command of M. Jacques Dunoque, only one of whom was wounded. The privateer was three days out of Samaria and had taken nothing. Racoon sent Alliance into Jamaica.

At some point between 1 March and 1 June 1805, Racoon, still under Gordon's command, captured a French sloop with a cargo of fustic. Gordon received his promotion to post captain on 16 May, but appears to have left Racoon before then, but after the capture of the sloop.

=== Lieutenant Edward Crofton ===
At some point Lieutenant Thomas Whinyates took command. His replacement, nominally in January 1805, was Lieutenant Edward Crofton.

On 11 May 1805, Crofton and Racoon were in the anchorage at Montego Bay when they sighted an enemy schooner boarding a drogger. Racoon gave chase but in the light winds was unable to catch up before the privateer and his prize reached Cape Cruz. On her way back to resume her station, Racoon encountered and captured the Spanish privateer felucca San Felix El Socoro, out of Santiago de Cuba. He had 40 men aboard and was armed with one 6-pounder gun that he had thrown overboard during the chase. The privateer had been out 11 days but had only captured a drogger.

Crofton received promotion to commander in June. Racoon recaptured the schooner Columbia on 25 August.

Lastly, Racoon rescued the crew of the Volunteer, which had foundered on her way from Jamaica to London.

== Fate ==
Racoon was broken up in April 1806.
