= Bordelais (1798 ship) =

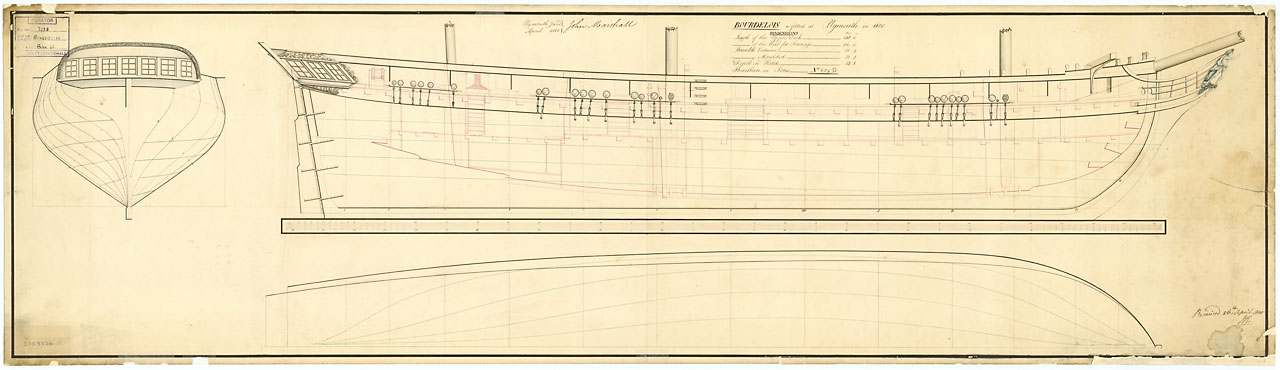
- Bordelais

History

France
- Name: Bordelais
- Builder: Courau brothers, Bordeaux. Plans by Forfait
- Laid down: 1798
- Commissioned: December 1798
- Captured: 11 October 1799

Great Britain
- Name: HMS Bordelais
- Acquired: 11 October 1799 by capture
- Commissioned: January 1800
- Fate: Broken up in 1804, or 1806

General characteristics
- Type: Corvette
- Displacement: 554 tons (French); 1,000 tons (French) fully loaded
- Tons burthen: 62463/94 (bm)
- Length: 42.55 m (139.6 ft) (overall); 38.0 m (124.7 ft) (keel)
- Beam: 9.74 m (32.0 ft)
- Draught: 4.87 m (16.0 ft)
- Complement: At capture: 202; British service:195
- Armament: Pierced for 24 × 8-pounder long guns; At capture: 16 × 12-pounder guns + 8 × 36-pounder obusiers; Royal Navy: 22 × 32-pounder carronades + 2 × 9-pounder chase guns

Bordelais (or Bourdolaise, or Bourdelais, or Bordolois), launched in 1799, was a privateer corvette from Bordeaux, France. She took part in three campaigns before HMS Révolutionnaire captured her. She then served the Royal Navy until broken up in 1804.

== French service ==
Bordelais departed Bordeaux in December 1798 under Jean-François Thibaut, returning in February 1799. Her command then passed to Jean-Baptiste Darrigrand, who cruised from February to through June.

At the beginning of June Bordelais left Pasajes in company with Grand Décidé and Courageaux. They planned to intercept a convoy from Brazil, send their prizes to Pasajes, and then return there. It is not clear that they were at all successful, and in any case HMS Alcmene captured Courageaux on 26 June.

Thibaut resumed command from July to August. In August, Jacques Moreau took command of Bordelais. (Note: He had been captain of the privateer Robert when the frigate HMS Syrencaptured Robert on 13 June 1793.) Her armament was upgraded she departed for a cruise.

On 6 October 1799 Bordelais, under the command of Captain Joseph Moreau, detained and took into Bayonne the American vessel Victory, Robert Hatton, master. Victory was carrying tobacco, cotton, and staves to London. Hatton would not divulge the names of the cargo's owners. The French court seized the cargo but released Victory.

== Capture ==
On 11 October 1799 Révolutionnaire was off the Irish coast when she sighted a strange sail. Révolutionnaire chased her quarry in a heavy gale for nine and a half hours over a distance of 114 miles (i.e., a rate of 12 miles per hour). When captured, the quarry turned out to be Bordelais, of Bordeaux. (Note: Rouvier gives a date of 1 October.) She was pierced for 26 guns but carried sixteen 12-pounder guns and eight 36-pounder carronades. She had a crew of 202 men. She had been cruising from Passage for 19 days during which time she had captured two vessels, an American ship carrying a cargo of tobacco, and a Portuguese ship sailing from Cork with provisions. Twysden, in an attempt to interest the Admiralty in purchasing her, described Bordelais as "a most beautiful new Ship, well calculated for His Majesty's Service; was the largest, and esteemed the fastest sailing Privateer out of France." (Note: It is common in accounts of captures for the captor to describe his prize as a remarkably fast sailer, which raises the question of how it is that he captured his quarry. In this case, however, it seems that Revolutionnaire and Bordelais were both among the fastest ships afloat, with other sources citing an even faster average speed around 14.3 miles per hour for a chase of 129 miles over nine hours; it is also claimed that they had the same builder, who had stated at a dinner celebrating Bordelais's first privateering voyage, that only Revolutionnaire could catch her.)

Bordelais arrived at Plymouth on 24 November. Four hundred French prisoners from Aréthuse and Bourdelaise landed at Plymouth on the same day. The Admiralty took Bordelais into service as the sixth-rate post ship Bordelais.

== HMS Bordelais ==
Bordelais stayed at Plymouth until April 1800, undergoing fitting out. Captain Thomas Manby commissioned her in January 1800. On 15 July, Bordelais captured the French vessel Phoenix. Indefatigable, Sirius, and Boadicea shared with Bordelais by agreement, as did Shannon. At some point, on a trip to Ireland the Bordelais foundered on a sandbank; Manby managed to refloat her by throwing everything possible overboard and she limped back to Plymouth; George Manby was also onboard.

Bordelais spent a short period spent blockading the port of Flushing. She proved unsuited to the task, being long, narrow, and low in the water, and consequently so wet her crew sickened. She therefore was ordered back to Spithead.

In December Manby sailed Bordelais for the Jamaica Station, in company with Andromache as escorts to a large convoy. A gale dispersed the convoy near Cape Finisterre and Bordelais was sent to the west of Barbados to look for stragglers. On her way she recaptured two of the stragglers (Aurora and Adventure) that had already fallen prey to French privateers.

The French privateer Mouche had captured Aurora, Redman, master, as she was near the Western Islands. Mouche also captured Adventure, Finlay, master. Bordelaise encountered Adventure, which only struck on 8 January 1801 after a long chase. From her Mandby found out that Mouche had captured Aurora too, and had sent her to Teneriffe. He sailed there and intercepted Aurora on 10 January as she arrived.

On 28 January 1801 Bordelais encountered three French vessels, two large brigs and a schooner, off Barbados. The three were to windward and started to chase Bordelais. Mandy shortened sail to give the enemy a better chance to catch up, which they did around sunset. Mandby then turned Bordelais and engaged the larger of the brigs at a range of ten yards. The other two French vessels held off when they realized she could fire her carronades on both broadsides. After about 30 minutes the larger brig struck Robert Barrie, First Lieutenant of Bordelais, took possession of the brig, which turned out to be the 18-gun gun brig Curieuse. (Note: Curieuse had been launched at Nantes in 1799 as the second member of the two-vessel Fleche-class of gun-brigs.) Curieuse was pierced for 20 guns and carried eighteen long 9-pounders. She had a crew of 168 men under the command of Captain G. Radelet. Victor "Hughes", governor of Cayenne, had dispatched the three vessels some 28 days earlier to intercept the outward-bound West Indies merchant fleet.

In the engagement Bordelais had one man killed and seven wounded, generally lightly. Curieuse had some 50 men killed and wounded. Radelet survived for a few hours but eventually died from having lost both legs. About an hour after the British took possession, Bordelais started to sink. Manby ordered everyone off her, but 21 British sailors delayed because they were extricating the French wounded. Most of the rescuers were themselves rescued, but seven drowned. Dealing with the situation, securing 120 French prisoners, and repairing sails and rigging delayed Bordelais until 8p.m. She then set off after the two French vessels that had fled but was unable to find them in the night.

In intercepting the three French vessels Manby helped protect the convoy from further predation. Reportedly, the French brig that escaped was Mutine, of sixteen 6-pounder guns and 156 men under the command of J. Reybaud, and the schooner Espérance, of six 4-pounder guns and 52 men under the command of Captain Haywood.

From Barbados Bordelais made her way to Jamaica via Martinique. She then cruised the Mona Passage, where apparently she did great damage to the local trade. In one case a cutting out expedition at Aguadilla Bay by boats from Bordelais and another British vessel cut out a vessel that Manby turned into a tender; this vessel was lost with all hands shortly thereafter. (Note: A key function of a tender was resupply, that is, shuttling back-and-forth between her vessel's base and the vessel herself with fresh food, water, etc. However, frequently tenders cruised independently.)

In a second attack at Aguadilla an attempt to cut out a schooner there ended in failure, but no casualties. The cannon fire from the Spanish defences did so much damage to Bordelais that she had to return to Port Royal for repairs.

Next, Bordelais cut out a small sloop with a cargo of wood from a small harbour on the coast of Puerto Rico. Manby cleared her and fitted her out as a tender. He put his second lieutenant James Gordon in command and gave him a crew of seven men and two boys. Shortly thereafter, a French privateer of one gun and 60 men captured Gordon and his sloop. The privateer took her prize into a small port near Aux Cayes. There they found another sloop, with a cargo of salt, that Bordelais captured the night before, and that the French had already recaptured, together with her prize crew of a midshipman and four men.

The port was under the control of the Haitian government of Toussaint Louverture, which threw the crew of the privateer into prison. The men from Bordelais spent four months in prison but were well treated, with Gordon and the midshipman being permitted to move freely on parole. Eventually all were released to a cartel under the command of Captain Kelpoisson, the commander of the port of Aux Cayes, and the only Frenchman in a position of authority. The British arrived at Port Royal (except for one man who had died), where they found out that the war was over. They returned to Bordelais, where Gordon was able to sit down in the officers' mess before any of his fellow officers even knew that he had returned.

On 23 October Barrie replaced Manby. This was a temporary appointment as Barrie was still a lieutenant. Bourdelais arrived in Portsmouth on 18 January 1802 at the same time as Barrie's promotion to commander was announced.

Then on 29 April 1802 Captain John Hayes replaced Barrie. One source has Commander Barrie as captain of Bourdelais in July 1802, but this seems to be in error.

== Fate ==
Bordelais was broken up in August 1804.

== Post-script ==
The lines of Bordelais were taken in England after her capture; these plans have been reproduced in Clippers français.
