= Nicholas Matthews Condy =

English painter

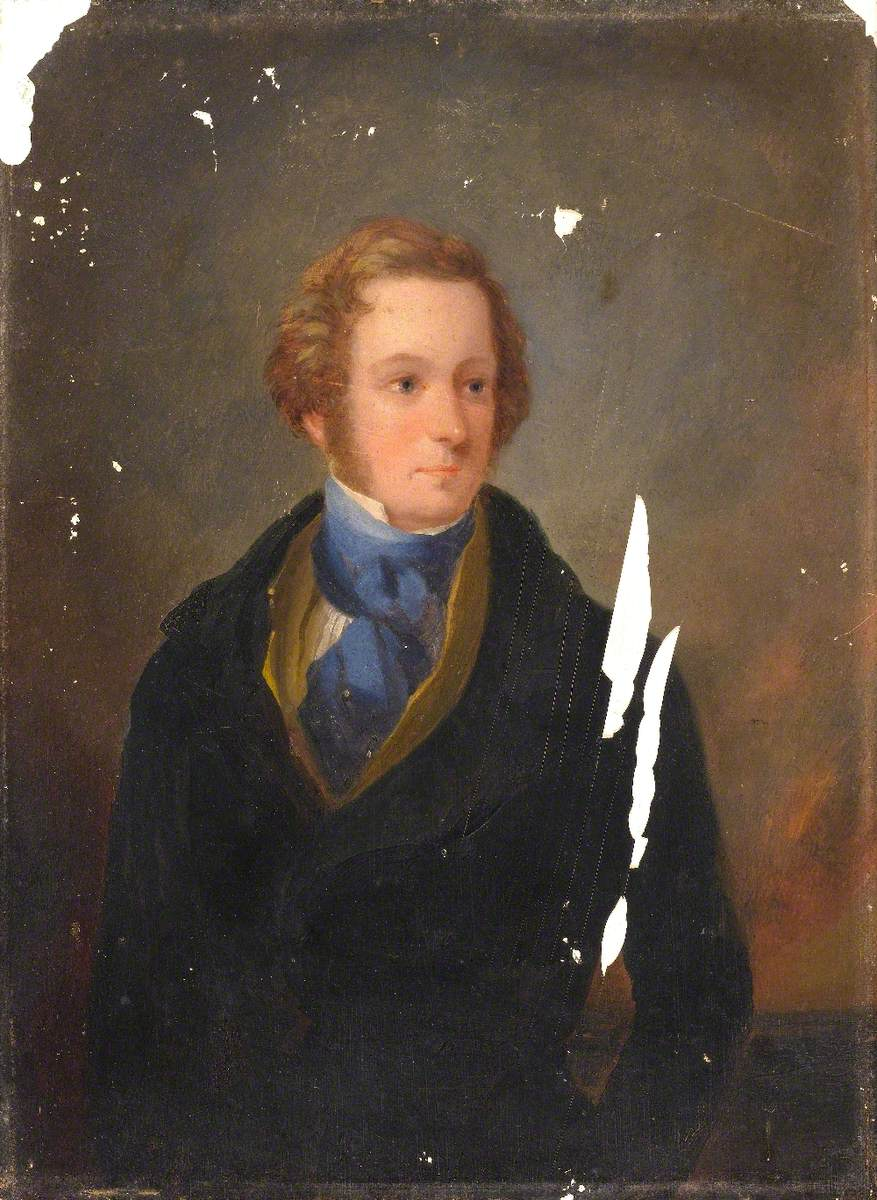
- Nicholas Matthew Condy, painted by his father
- Born: 1818; Plymouth
- Died: 20 May 1851 (aged 32–33); Plymouth
- Education: Studied under The Reverend C Thomas of Lew Trenchard
- Known for: Marine art
- Notable work: Include: The Post Office Packet Shelldrake off Falmouth; Ships off Devonport; On board the Yacht Alarm; Plymouth Sound from Mount Edgcumbe; The Mew Stone from Maker Heights
- Patrons: George Wyndham, 3rd Earl of Egremont

Nicholas Matthew(s) Condy, or Nicholas Condy the Younger, or Junior (1818 – 20 May 1851) was a British maritime painter.

== Life ==
=== Birth and education ===
He was born on 1818 in Dover to Nicholas Condy (1793–1857) and Ann Trevanion Condy (née Pyle; 1792–1860), but baptised on 6 April 1824 in Plymouth, St Andrew. His father was a painter of landscapes, and they are often confused with each other. He went to the Mount Radford School in Exeter and later studied under The Reverend C Thomas of Lew Trenchard. Intended for a career in the Army or Navy, he instead became a professional marine painter.

=== Artistic career ===
His work attracted the early admiration of the Earl of Egremont, J. M. W. Turner’s patron. Three of his sea-pieces were exhibited at the Royal Academy from 1842 to 1845, which gave hopes of his becoming a distinguished artist.

=== Death ===
He lived in Plymouth until his sudden and premature death at the Grove, Plymouth, on 20 May 1851 when aged only thirty-two. He left a widow, Flora Ross, the third daughter of Major John Lockhart Gallie, of the 28th Regiment and a daughter, Harriet Charlotte Florence Pigott Condy (1846–1880) who married the painter Walter Duncan (1848–1932). After his death Flora married her cousin Samuel Charles Roby.

== Style and artistic achievement ==
Condy used a detailed knowledge of ships acquired in his home town to paint accurate ship portraits, and his native Devon countryside is featured in such paintings as Ships off Devonport and The Post Office Packet Shelldrake off Falmouth (both in the National Maritime Museum, London). He was a successful and established artist whose work is still sought after today.

== Selected works ==
The Tsar of Russia's Yacht, The Queen Victoria, with other Shipping off the Coast

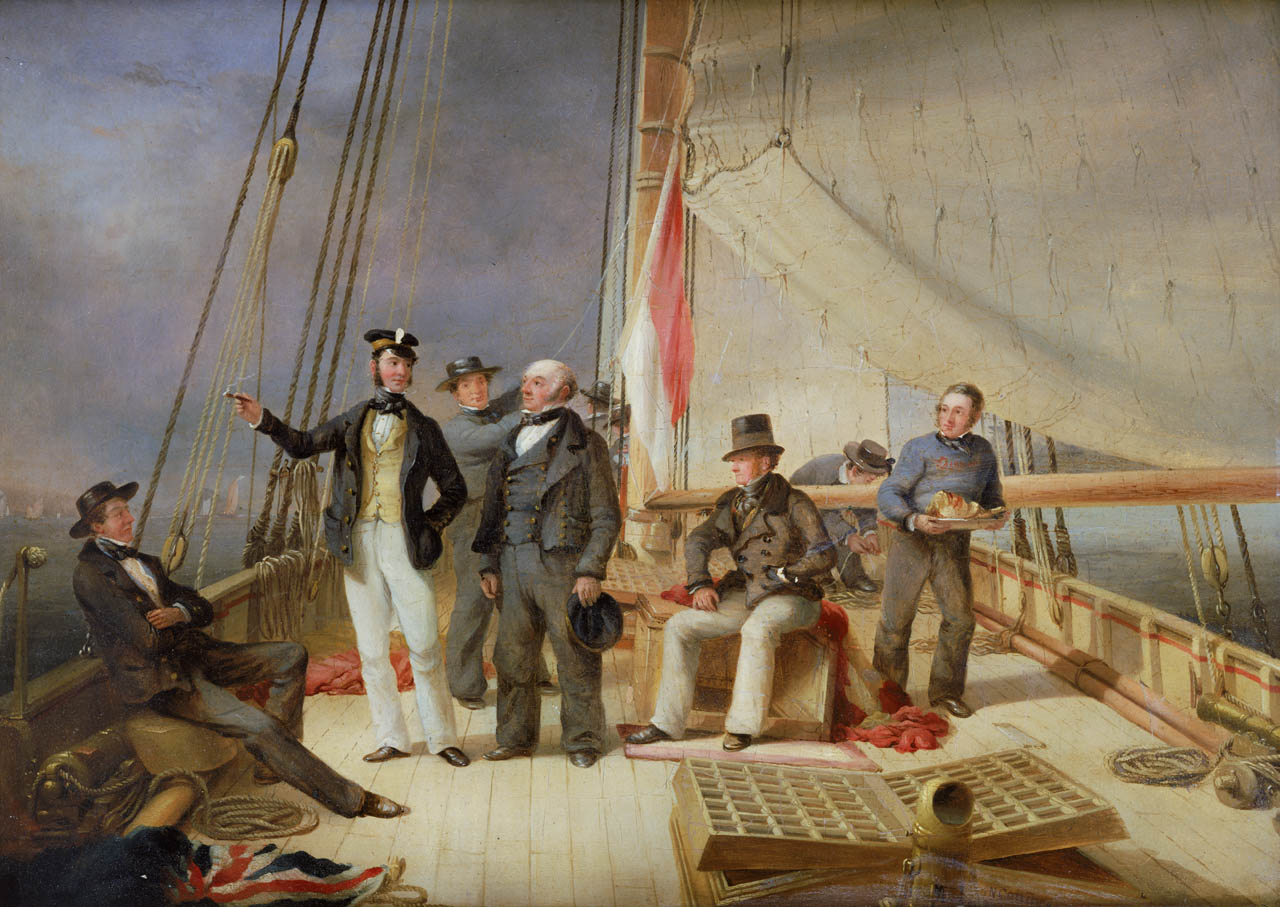
On board the Yacht Alarm

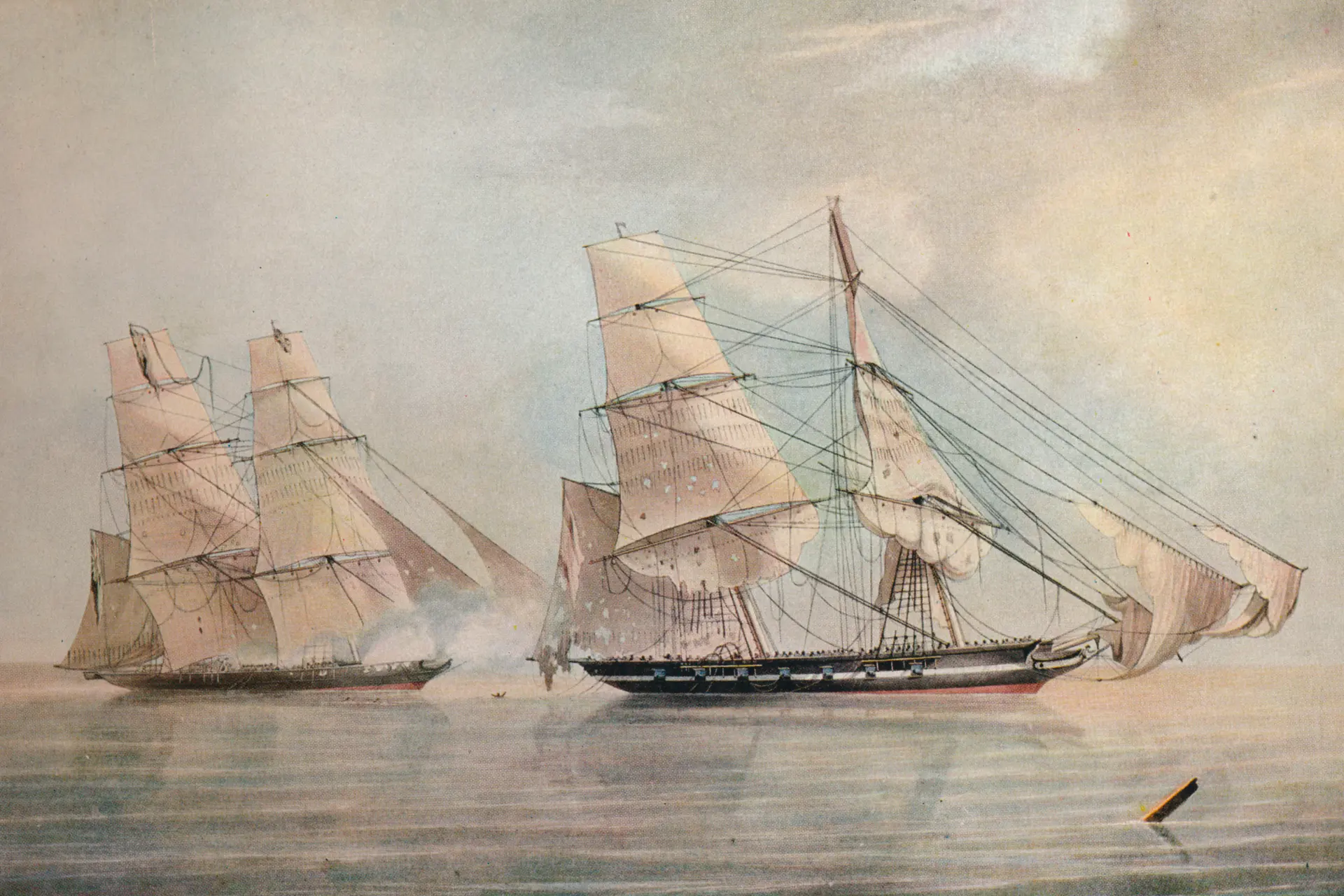
HMS Black Joke firing on the Spanish Slaver El Almirante
