= Aurora (1793 ship) =

Ship launched at Chester in 1793 as a West Indiaman

History

Great Britain
- Name: Aurora
- Launched: 1793, Chester
- Fate: Last listed in 1831 (LR) or 1833 (Register of Shipping)

General characteristics
- Tons burthen: 285, 289, or 291, or 300 (bm)
- Complement: 25
- Armament: 1803:10 × 4&6-pounder guns; 1810:10 × 9-pounder guns

Aurora was launched at Chester in 1793 as a West Indiaman. During her career first the French (twice) and then the United States' privateer captured her, but she returned to British hands. Between 1801 and 1808 she made four voyages from Liverpool as a slave ship in the triangular trade in enslaved people. Afterwards, she continued to trade widely until 1831.

== Career ==
Aurora first appeared in Lloyd's Register (LR) in 1794. Her master was listed as A. Harper, her owner as Kensington & Co., and trade London–St Vincent.

Aurora then disappeared from LR until 1798. The 1795 volume is missing pages. A letter dated 26 June 1795, at St Pierre, Martinique, reported the capture by the French of several ships from the West India convoy, including "Aurora, Merchantman". LL reported that three French frigates had captured Aurora, Hooper, master, from London to St Vincents, Hero, Clark, master, from London to Antigua, Montserrat Packet. Beswick, master, from London to Montserrat, Blenheim, from London to Jamaica, and about ten other outward bound vessels near Barbados. The French took their captures into Guadeloupe.

Lloyd's List (LL) reported on 17 June 1796 that HMS Cleopatra had captured "Aurora (late Hooper)", as Aurora was sailing from Guadeloupe to France. Cleopatra sent Aurora into Halifax, Nova Scotia.

Aurora re-entered LR in 1798 R. Redman, master, Mallough, owner, and trade London–Barbados.

The French privateer Mouche captured Aurora, Redman, master, as she was near the Western Islands while sailing from London to Barbados. Mouche also captured Adventure, Finlay, master, which was sailing from London to Martinique. HMS Bordelais recaptured them both.

LR for 1801 showed Aurora with R. Redman, master, changing to T.Royle, Mallough, owner, changing to G.Case, and trade London–Barbados, changing to Liverpool–Africa.

1st voyage transporting enslaved people (1801–1803): Captain Thomas Sedgewick Royle sailed from Liverpool on 1 November 1801. In 1801, 147 vessels sailed from English ports, bound for Africa to acquire and transport enslaved people; 122 of these vessels sailed from Liverpool.

Aurora acquired captives at Calabar and on 11 October 1802 delivered about 300 to Saint Thomas. She left St Thomas on 1 January 1803, and arrived back at Liverpool on 3 March. She had left Liverpool with 32 crew members and suffered eight crew deaths on the voyage.

2nd voyage transporting enslaved people (1803–1804): Captain Thomas Chamley sailed from Liverpool on 28 April 1803. In 1803, 99 vessels sailed from English ports, bound for Africa to acquire and transport enslaved people; 83 of these vessels sailed from Liverpool.

Captain Thomas Chambey acquired a letter of marque on 2 July 1803. Aurora acquired captives on the African coast and arrived at Kingston, Jamaica, on 9 April 1804, where she landed 262 captives. She sailed from Kingston on 17 June, and arrived at Liverpool on 11 August. She had left with 31 crew members and she suffered eight crew deaths on her voyage.

3rd voyage transporting enslaved people (1804–1806): Captain Thomas Chamley, Jr. sailed from Liverpool 1 November 1804. In 1804, 147 vessels sailed from English ports, bound for Africa to acquire and transport enslaved people; 126 of these vessels sailed from Liverpool.

Aurora commenced acquiring captives at Calabar on 14 January 1805. Captain Chamley died on 20 July 1805; Captain William Gilbert replaced Chamley. Aurora arrived at Kingston on 15 August and there landed 219 captives. She left Kingston on 9 May 1806, and arrived back at Liverpool on 4 July. Aurora had left Liverpool with 49 crew members and she had suffered 14 crew deaths on the voyage.

4th voyage transporting enslaved people (1806–1808): Captain Vincent May sailed from Liverpool on 29 September 1806. Aurora acquired captives at Bonny and Calabar, and arrived at Kingston on 27 June 1807. There she landed 229 captives. She left Kingston on 27 November, and arrived back at Liverpool on 27 January 1808. She had left Liverpool with 55 crew members and she had suffered nine crew deaths on the voyage.

The Slave Trade Act 1807 had abolished the British slave trade but because Aurora had cleared to sail before 1 May 1807, this last voyage was legal.

On her return Aurora underwent a good repair in 1808 and then became a West Indiaman.

Year	Master	Owner	Trade	Source
1809	W.Phipps; J.Small	G.Case	Liverpool–Trinidad	LR; repairs 1806
1810	J.Small; T. Allen	G.Case	Liverpool–Norfolk	LR; repairs 1806
1815	S.Stott	Ross & Co.	Liverpool–Bahia	LR; large repairs 1812 & 1814

On 18 February 1815 the American schooner privateer Fox, captured Aurora, Scott, master, but because Aurora was in ballast, released her. Aurora arrived at Barbados on the 22nd.

Year	Master	Owner	Trade	Source
1820	S. Scott, T.Atherdon	Ross & Co.	Liverpool–New Brunswick	LR; large repairs 1812 & 1814, & good repairs 1819
1825	H.Lewis	Ross & Co.	Liverpool–North Scotland	LR; repairs 1819
1830	J.Henning	Buchanan	Liverpool–Sierra Leone	LR; good repairs 1829 & 1830

== Fate ==
Aurora was last listed in LR in 1831 with J. Herring, master, and Buchanan, owner, but with no trade. She was last listed in 1833 in the Register of Shipping with stale data since 1830.
