= French corvette Mutine (1799) =

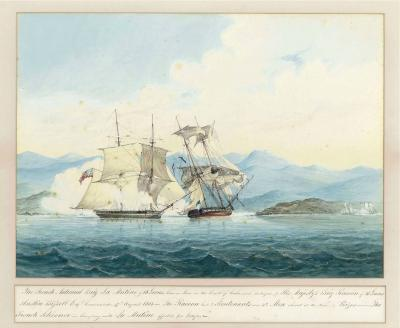
- HMS Racoon capturing French navy corvette Mutine, circle of William John Huggins

History

France
- Name: Mutine
- Builder: Le Havre
- Laid down: October 1797
- Launched: 17 May 1799
- Fate: Wrecked in combat 17 August 1803

General characteristics
- Class & type: Mutine-class corvette
- Displacement: 379-400 tons (French)
- Length: 30.86 m (101.2 ft) (overall); 29.33 m (96.2 ft) (keel)
- Beam: 8.61 m (28.2 ft)
- Depth of hold: 4.3 m (14 ft)
- Complement: 156
- Armament: 18 × 8-pounder guns

Mutine was the name-vessel of her two-vessel class of corvettes designed by Charles-Henri Tellier. She was ordered as Nouvelle in 1797, but received the name Mutine at her launching in May 1799. She was wrecked near Santiago de Cuba on 17 August 1803 as a consequence of a single-ship action with HMS Racoon.

== Career ==
Her commander in 1799 was Captain Lambert.

On 28 January 1801 HMS Bordelais was west of Barbados when she encountered two French brigs and a French schooner. They gave chase but then Bordelais turned. In the short engagement that followed she captured the larger of the brigs, Curieuse, which sank within an hour or so of her capture. The two other French vessels escaped early in the engagement. Reportedly, the French "brig" that escaped was Mutine, of sixteen 6-pounder guns and 156 men under the command of J. Reybaud (or Raybaun), and the French schooner was Espérance, of six 4-pounder guns and 52 men under the command of Captain Haywood.

== Loss ==
In 1803, Mutine, under the command of Lieutenant de vaisseau Reybaud, sailed from Gibraltar and Málaga, spain, for the French Antilles. The crossing took 38 days, during which Mutine took two prizes.

Once in the French Antilles, Mutine sailed from Port-de-Paix to Santiago de Cuba.

At 1 p.m. on 12 August 1803, Racoon sighted a what she identified as a brig coming along shore that met up with a schooner that had been avoiding the British all day. At 3 p.m. the two came up together, but Racoon held back. Then at 4:15 p.m. the brig hoisted French colours and opened fire on Racoon. Racoon and the brig exchanged broadsides, with Racoon's fire bringing down most of the brig's rigging. The brig ran on shore on the rocks in a small bay, where she struck her colours. After some maneuvering, Racoon fired a broadside from her other side to try to destroy her. After about half an hour, the brig raised her colours again. Racoon made several passes, firing on the brig, which lost her mainmast near sunset, and fell on her side. The brig sent her crew ashore in boats while Racoon watched all night. On the morning of 13 August, it was clear that the brig was a complete wreck, having lost her masts and being full of water. Commander Austin Bissell, of Racoon, decided not to permit Racoon's sailing master to take a boat and some men to the brig to burn her because there were too many armed men on shore who would fire on any boarding party. Also, Racoon was undermanned, her two lieutenants and 42 men being away in the prizes she had taken in July. During the engagement, the French schooner made her escape despite the efforts of Lieutenant Wright to capture her, using a prize that Racoon had captured earlier.

The destroyed brig turned out to be Mutine.
