= Adventure (1799 ship) =

History

Great Britain
- Name: Adventure
- Builder: France
- Acquired: 1799 by purchase of a prize
- Fate: Wrecked October 1814

General characteristics
- Tons burthen: 347, or 368, or 379 (bm)
- Complement: 1799: 40; 1801: 35
- Armament: 1799: 20 × 9-pounder guns + 2 × 18-pounder carronades; 1801: 16 × 6-pounder guns + 2 × 18-pounder carronades; 1815: 6 × 4-pounder guns

Adventure was a vessel built in France that the British captured c.1799. New owners immediately sailed her as a slave ship in the triangular trade in enslaved people. She then made a voyage as West Indiaman during which a French privateer captured her, but the British Royal Navy quickly recaptured her. She made a second slave trading voyage. Thereafter she became a general trader, trading primarily with the Baltic. She was wrecked in October 1814. Although she was refloated and taken into Copenhagen, she disappeared from subsequent ship arrival and departure data.

== Career ==
Adventure first appeared in Lloyd's Register (LR) in 1800 with G. Bernard, master, Gibb, owner, and trade London–Africa. She had undergone repairs in 1799. Captain George Bernard acquired a letter of marque on 3 December 1799.

1st enslaving voyage (1800–1801): Captain Bernard sailed from Liverpool on 16 January 1800, bound for Bonny. Adventure delivered 337 captives to Kingston, Jamaica on 31 August. She returned to Liverpool on 28 January 1801.

West Indiaman: On her return from this voyage, new owners sailed her as a West Indiaman.

Year	Master	Owner	Trade	Source
1801	G.Bernard; W.Findlay	Gibbs; Hughan & Co.	Liverpool–Africa; London–Africa	LR

The French privateer Mouche captured Adventure, Finlay, master, as she was near the Western Islands while sailing from London to Martinique. Mouche also captured Aurora, Redman, master, which was sailing from London to Barbados. HMS Bordelais recaptured them both. Bordelaise encountered Adventure, which only struck on 8 January 1801 after a long chase. From her the British found out that Mouche had captured Aurora too, and had sent her to Teneriffe. Bordelais sailed there and intercepted Aurora on 10 January as she arrived.

Adventure arrived at Barbados on 3 February and from there sailed on to Martinique.

2nd enslaving voyage (1801–1802): Captain William Findlay acquired a letter of marque on 24 August 1801. Captain Findlay sailed from London on 5 September 1801, bound for New Calabar. Adventure delivered 358 captives to Kingston on 1 March 1802, having passed Demerara on 15 February. She sailed from Kingston on 15 May and arrived back at London on 19 July.

Year	Master	Owner	Trade	Source & notes
1804	W.Findlay; R.Corner	Hughan & Co. T.Benson	London–Africa; London–Baltic	LR; repairs 1799
1810	Walker	T.Benson	London–Baltic	LR; repairs 1799

In the issue for 8 February 1811, Lloyd's List (LL) reported that Adventure, Walker, master, had probably been lost or taken while sailing from Siloe to London. In the next issue it reported that she had arrived at the Downs on 8 February.

== Fate ==
On 29 October 1814 Adventure, Stonehouse, master was driven ashore at Dragør, Denmark. She was on a voyage from Saint Petersburg to Portsmouth. The initial report was that she was full of water but it was expected that her cargo would be saved. Adventure was later refloated and taken in to Copenhagen, Denmark.

Year	Master	Owner	Trade	Source & notes
1815	Stonehouse	T.Benson	Falmouth–Halifax	LR; good repair 1810 and large repair 1813

Lloyd's Register continued to carry Adventure for several years with unchanged data.
