= Walter Duncan (painter) =

English painter

Walter Duncan ARWS
- Born: 3 December 1847; Hampstead Road, London, England
- Died: 1932; Richmond, London, England
- Known for: Painting

Walter Duncan (1847-1932) ARWS was a British painter and watercolorist.

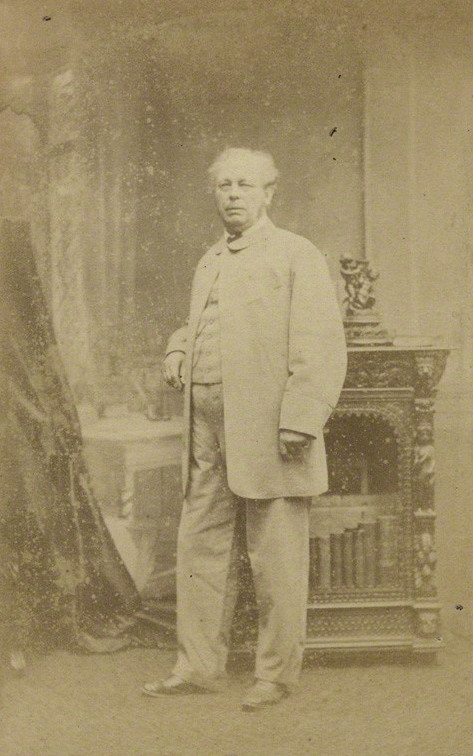
Portrait of Walter Duncan's father, the artist Edward Duncan

== Biography ==
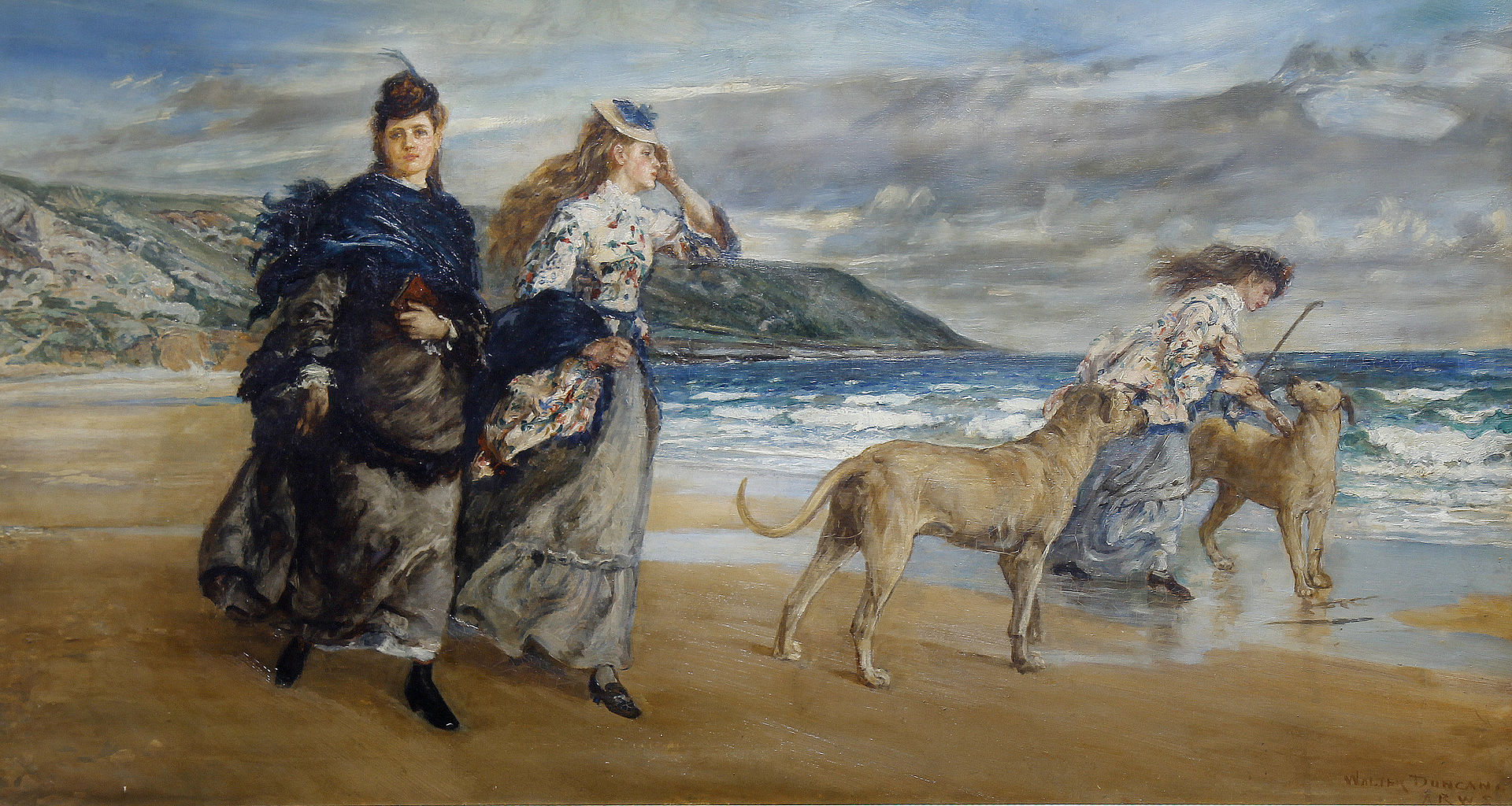
'A Breeze after a Bathe' by Walter Duncan (1872)

Walter Duncan was born in London in 1847 to the Royal Academy artist Edward Duncan RWS and his wife Berthia, the daughter of British marine painter William John Huggins. His older brother was the artist Allan Duncan (1844-1925). Walter Duncan studied at the Heatherley School of Fine Art before entering the Royal Academy Schools. In 1874 he was elected an Associate of the Royal Watercolour Society and his paintings from then on bear the initials A.R.W.S. beneath his signature. Although principally a watercolourist - he exhibited 224 paintings at the RWS - Walter Duncan also painted in oils, though examples are rare.

In 1871 he married Harriet Charlotte Condy (1846-1880), the daughter of the painter Nicholas Matthews Condy. In 1883, after her death, he married Elizabeth Sophia Anne Haase Child Gascoyne, the daughter of an officer stationed in the North-Western Provinces. This led to a two-year stay in India.

Between 1869 and 1893 Duncan exhibited at the Royal Academy, the Royal Society of British Artists, the Grosvenor Gallery, the New Gallery, and the Royal Watercolour Society. From the 1870s he was also one of the principal artists of The Illustrated London News. He died in Richmond, London in 1932.

== Works in Museums ==
- Heathland Landscape in the A la Ronde, Devon.
- Fanciulla nel bosco (1898) and Venditrice di fiori a St. Martin in the Fields (1919) in the Museo d'arte, Avellino.
- The First Interview between Elizabeth Woodville and King Edward IV (1902) in the Royal Collection, London.
- Here Lotus Blossoms are found (1886) in the Royal Collection, London.
- Various landscapes in the Craven Museum & Gallery, Skipton, North Yorkshire.

== Bibliography ==
WRIGIT Christopher, GORDON Catherine Mary, SMITH Mary Peskett (2006), “Walter Duncan”, in IDEM British and Irish Paintings in Public Collections, New Haven 2006, Yale University Press, p. 310.
