= French ship Mutin (1883) =

The Mutin was a school cutter of the French Navy.

== Career ==
Mutin was launched in 1883 to serve as a school ship. She served as an auxiliary warship during the First World War.

She was offered to the École navale in 1924, and served as a schoolship as Sylphe.

She was decommissioned in 1937, though she still sailed in Toulon in 1942-1943.
