= Wilson Rathborne =

British Royal Navy captain

Captain Wilson Rathborne
- Born: 16 July 1748; Loughrea, County Galway
- Died: 1831 (aged 82–83)
- Occupation: Royal Navy captain

Wilson Rathborne (16 July 1748 – 1831) was a British Royal Navy captain.

== Biography ==
Rathborne, the son of Richard Rathborne, was born on 16 July 1748 near Loughrea, County Galway. He began his naval career in September 1763 as an able seaman on the Niger, serving with Sir Thomas Adams on the Newfoundland station. Over the next six years, he served as both able seaman and midshipman on the Niger, then followed Adams to the Boston and Romney, returning to England in 1770. In 1773, he joined the Hunter sloop as an able seaman becoming a midshipman some months later. After accepting a warrant as master of the Hunter, he waited until 1780 to return to England. With an introduction to the Earl of Sandwich, he passed his examination on March 16, 1780, and was promoted to lieutenant of the Bedford serving under Commodore Edmund Affleck. Rathborne saw action in the Bedford, including engagements off the Chesapeake, at St. Kitts in January, and under the lee of Dominica. After the Bedford was paid off in summer of 1783, Rathborne served in the Atlas and Colossus between 1787 and 1791. In December 1792 he was appointed to the Captain, participating in the occupation of Toulon, the reduction of Corsica, and the action of 14 March 1795, when he was severely wounded in the right arm, and lost his right eye. Invalided for recovery, he was promoted to commander on November 9, 1795.

In 1797, he commanded the Good Design, convoying trade from Leith to the Elbe or Elsinore. In December 1799, he was appointed to the Racoon brig, which he commanded in the Channel, Mediterranean, and West Indies. On 18 November 1802, he was posted to the Santa Margarita returning to England in 1803. He remained in the Santa Margarita, attached to the Channel fleet and on 4 November 1805, he (alongside Sir Richard John Strachan) helped capture French ships that had escaped from Talfagar. Rathborne was then appointed to the Foudroyant, much to his disgust, as he conceived that a cruising frigate was likely to give him greater opportunities of distinction and prize-money. He appealed to the admiralty, and Captain John Wentworth Loring [q. v.], who was appointed to succeed him in the Margarita, amiably held back his commission till the pleasure of the admiralty could be known. In the end, Loring was appointed to the Niobe, and Rathborne remained in the Santa Margarita till December 1807, when the ship, being quite worn out, was paid off. For the next two years, Rathborne commanded the sea fencibles of the Essex coast, and from 1810 to 1813 had charge of the impress service in the Tyne. In 1810, he was granted a pension for the loss of his eye, and this was afterwards increased to 300l. a year. In 1815, he was nominated a C.B. In 1822 he was appointed superintendent of the ordinary at Chatham, a post which he held till his death in the summer of 1831. He married, in 1805, a daughter of John French of Loughrea, and left issue. His sister was the mother of John Wilson Croker.
