= French brig Lodi =

Lodi
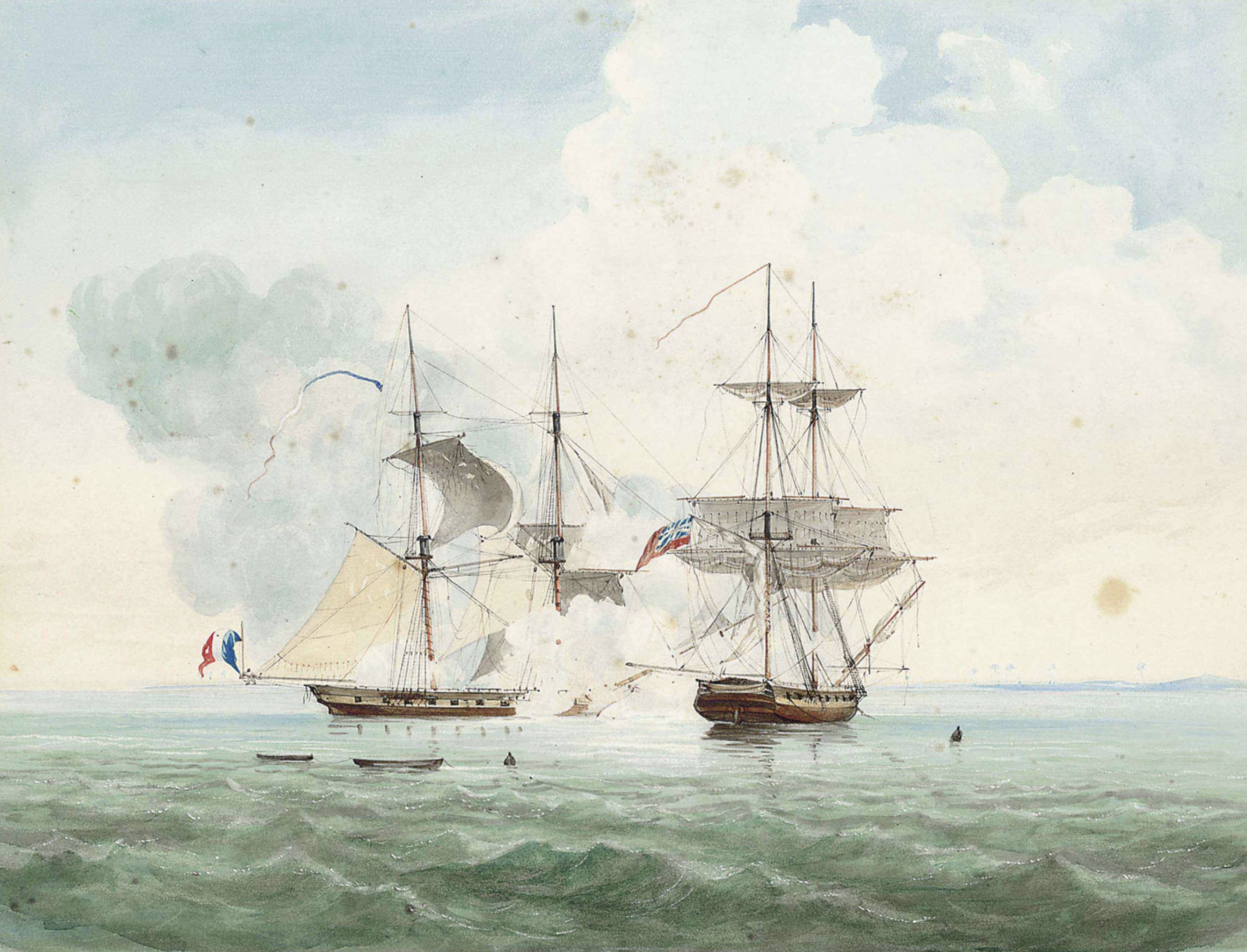
- Lodi (left) at the action of 11 July 1803

History

Venetian Republic
- Name: Giasone
- Namesake: Jason, a hero from Greek mythology
- Laid down: 29 August 1791
- Launched: 29 August 1795
- Captured: 1797

France
- Name: Jason
- Namesake: Battle of Lodi
- Acquired: 1797 by capture
- Renamed: Lodi
- Captured: 1803

General characteristics
- Type: Brig-corvette
- Displacement: 400 tons
- Length: 27.1 m (89 ft)
- Beam: 9.4 m (31 ft)
- Draught: Unladen:3.08 m (10.1 ft); Laden:9.4 m (31 ft)
- Depth of hold: 4.87 m (16.0 ft)
- Propulsion: Sails
- Sail plan: Brig
- Complement: 94
- Armament: Originally: 20 × 8-pounder guns; November 1797: 20 × 6-pounder guns; January 1800: 14 × 6-pounder guns + 2 × 3-pounder guns + 6 × 36-pounder obusiers

Lodi was the Venetian navy brig Giasone, launched in 1795. The French captured her at Corfu in 1797. She took part in a sanguinary and inconclusive single-ship action with a British privateer shortly after her capture. She continued to serve in the Mediterranean carrying dispatches between France and Alexandria and then moved to the West Indies where she supported the Saint-Domingue expedition. HMS Racoon captured her on 11 July 1803; her subsequent fate is unknown.

== Career ==
Giasone was a Venetian vessel, possibly originally a cutter but completed as a brig. The French captured her at Corfu on 23 July 1797. The French initially named her Jason, but after the Battle of Lodi they renamed her Lodi on 11 November 1797.

Jason arrived at Toulon on 7 February 1798. On 12 May she was in Carthage roads, while under the command of Enseigne de vaisseau Sennequier. She was on a cruise between Almeria and North Africa.

On 4 July 1798, Lodi, was sailing down the Piombino Channel from Leghorn with dispatches for Napoleon Bonaparte, then at Alexandria. She encountered a British brig that attacked her and the two vessels exchanged fire. The crew of the brig twice attempted to board Lodi and twice the French repelled them. The French then attempted to board the brig, and the British repelled them. The two vessels separated and continued to exchange fire, with the French succeeding in bringing down the brig's masts. Even so, the French did not capture the brig, which used sweeps to reach the neutral coast of Tuscany, where it took refuge by a fort. Lodi, although she had retained her masts, was sufficiently damaged that she had to stop at Civita Vecchia to effect repairs. Lodi then continued on to Alexandria. Lodi had lost two men killed and more than 25 sailors and soldiers wounded, including Sennequier.

Lodi reported that she had engaged the British sloop of war Aigle, of a "force much superior to her own". Various accounts give Lodi's armament as 12 guns. Sennequier was immediately promoted to the rank of Capitaine de frégate.

There was no Aigle or Eagle in the Royal Navy at the time, nor any mention of the encounter in the logbooks of any British navy vessels matching her description. A Paris newspaper later reported that on 28 July, the British privateer brig Acquila, under the command of Captain Colonna, of 14 guns and 57 men, had arrived at Leghorn in great distress, having engaged a French vessel on 4 July. This may have been the ship Eagle, Captain Colin Campbell, of twelve 6-pounder guns and 317 tons (bm), which had received her letter of marque on 13 June 1797. (Note: French accounts dispute James's implication that Sennequier had exaggerated the size of his opponent and point out that Sennequier's official report is unlikely to be in error.)

On the night of 1 March, or the next morning, Lodi arrived at Alexandria. With the failure of Ganteaume's expeditions, she was one of the few French ships to penetrate the British blockade. In mid-May Lodi sailed for France, taking with her General Reynier, dispatched by General Menou, the French commander in Egypt. Lodi reached Toulon on 12 June, bringing with her a captured British vessel with 3-4,000 quintals of wheat.

In June 1799, Lodi sailed from Toulon, in company with Frippone, arriving at Carthage on 24 June. There they joined Vice-Admiral Bruix's squadron, engaged in what became known as the fruitless cruise of Bruix.

On 10 April 1800 was under the command of lieutenant de vaisseau Gastaud. She was on a round trip carrying dispatches between Toulon and Damietta.

On 28 June 1801 she was under the command of lieutenant de vaisseau Guien. She was engaged in transporting General Reynier and dispatches from Alexandria to Nice.

== West Indies ==
Still under Guien's command, between 19 June and 13 September 1802, she sailed from Livorno to Cap-François via Malaga and Cadiz. She was escorting 13 vessels that were carrying 2,270 men of the Polish Legions.

On 3 November 1802 Lodi was under the command of Lieutenant de vaisseau Lafosse. Admiral Jean-Baptiste Philibert Willaumez sent a letter to General Pierre Quantin, who was besieged at Saint-Marc, apologizing that he could not spare any other vessels. At the same time, Willaumez instructed Lafosse to gather all the schooners that the captain of Léogâne could assemble and escort them to Saint-Marc. There he was to put them at Quantin's disposal for the evacuation of the French population in the town. Once the schooners were loaded, he was to escort them to Port-au-Prince.

Lodi returned to on 13 December. At some point Lieutenant de vaisseau M. Pierre Isaac Taupier replaced Lafosse. Willaumez then sent her to take up a station below Fort Bizoton. Next, he had Lodi take 100 men to Léogâne, to clear the rebels from the shore front. Lodi arrived too late to do anything immediately, but with the arrival of further reinforcements, the rebels were dispersed.

General Donatien de Rochambeau, the French commander-in-chief in Saint-Domingue, wrote a letter on 15 January 1803 requesting a promotion for Taupier, commander of Lodi, and two other naval commanders, in part for their services at Léogâne. The announcement of Taupier's promotion to Capitaine de frégate appeared on 26 May 1803. On 18 May, Lodi succeeded in intercepting three barges and 50 men between Arcahaie and Léogâne. The air was too calm for Lodi to be able to capture the barges, but through cannon fire she was able to force them ashore near Grand-Goâve.

== Capture ==
On 11 July 1803, the British brig-sloop HMS Racoon , under Commander Austin Bissell, was sailing between Guanaba and St. Domingo in the West Indies when she sighted a French naval brig anchored in Léogâne Roads. As Racoon sailed towards her, Bissell saw that the French had springs on their cables and were ready to engage. Racoon was flying the French flag, and although he was unaware that the war had broken out again between France and Britain, the French captain was wary, rightly so as things turned out. At 2:45 p.m. Racoon anchored, also with springs, 30 yards from the brig. She then exchanged her French ensign for the British, and opened fire. The two vessels exchanged fire for half an hour before the French vessel cut his cables and tried to sail away. Racoon followed and after about another 10 minutes of fire from Racoon, the French brig surrendered.

The Frenchman was Lodi, pierced for 20 guns but with only 10 mounted. The French had lost one man killed and 13 or 14 men wounded; Racoon had only one man wounded. One French account gives Lodi's armament as six 6-pounder guns. Whether the number was six, 10, or 12 guns, Racoon, with 18 cannon, of which 16 were 32-pounder carronades, heavily outgunned Lodi. Also, Lodi's crew numbered only 40 men, many of them ill. In all, she was not in a position to put up a strong defence. Lodi was among a number of British prizes that arrived at Jamaica between 2 and 16 July.
