= William John Huggins =

British artist (1781–1845)

William John Huggins (1781 – 19 May 1845) was a British marine painter who won royal patronage for his work.

== Life ==
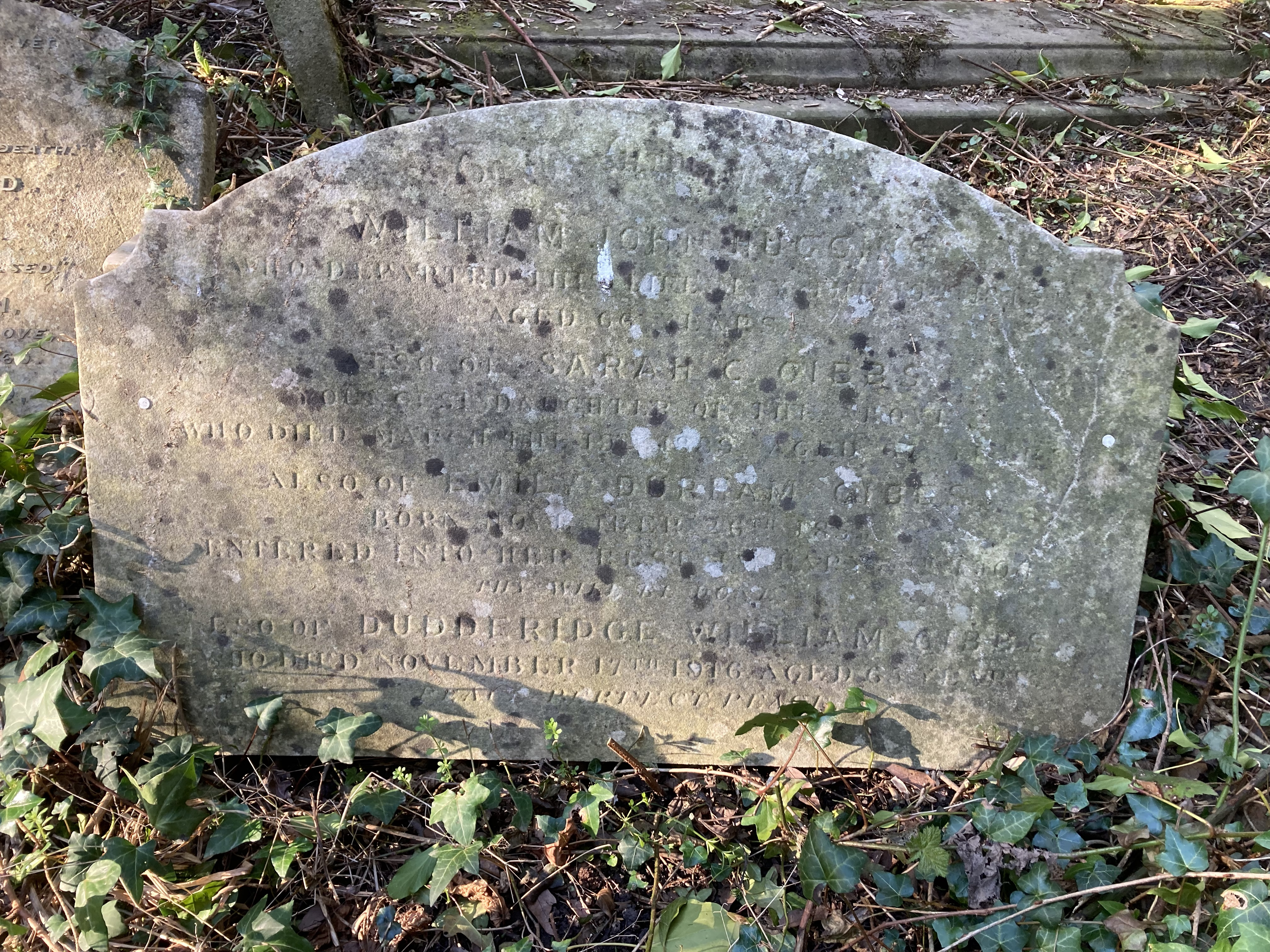
Grave of William John Huggins in Highgate Cemetery

Little is known of Huggins' early life. He made one voyage between December 1812 and August 1814 as an ordinary seaman on the East Indiaman Perseverance on her voyage to Bombay and China. During this voyage he made many drawings of ships and landscapes in China and elsewhere. He eventually settled in Leadenhall Street, near East India House in London, England, and practised his art as a profession, being specially employed to make drawings of ships in the company's service. His work, both original and as prints, found a ready market amongst merchants and seamen.

In 1817 Huggins exhibited a picture in the Royal Academy, and continued to exhibit occasionally up to his death. He also exhibited at the British Institution from 1825 onwards. He became a marine-painter to George IV and to William IV - for the latter painting three large pictures of the Battle of Trafalgar.

In about 1805 he married Berthia, their children included: James Miller Huggins (1807–1870), also a marine artist; John William Huggins (1809–?) and Berthia Huggins (1811–1884) who married Edward Duncan and was the mother of Walter Duncan. James and John both contributed to Huggins' Marine Sketches.

Huggins died in Leadenhall Street, London, in May 1845. He was buried on the western side of Highgate Cemetery.

== Works ==
Huggins' nautical knowledge ensured his pictures had some repute as portraits of ships, and, although "weak in colouring and general composition" (according to art historian Lionel Cust), they are regarded as a valuable record of the shipping of the period. Some of his work was engraved.

=== Paintings (selected) ===
- The gallant encounter between H.M.S. Boadicea and two French warships Le Duquay-Trouin and Guerriére on 31st August 1803 (1822 - Christie's)
- Battle of Trafalgar, 21 October 1805
- The Royal George on her return from Ireland

== Gallery ==
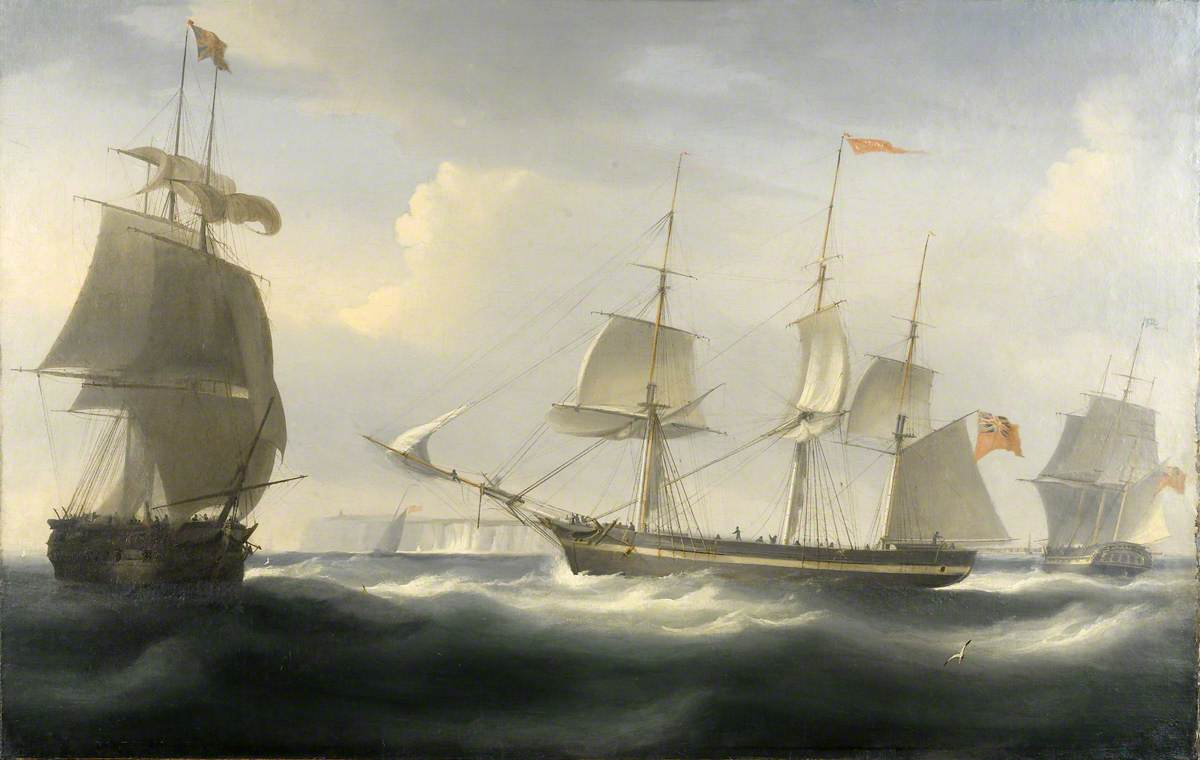
The Ship Delaford

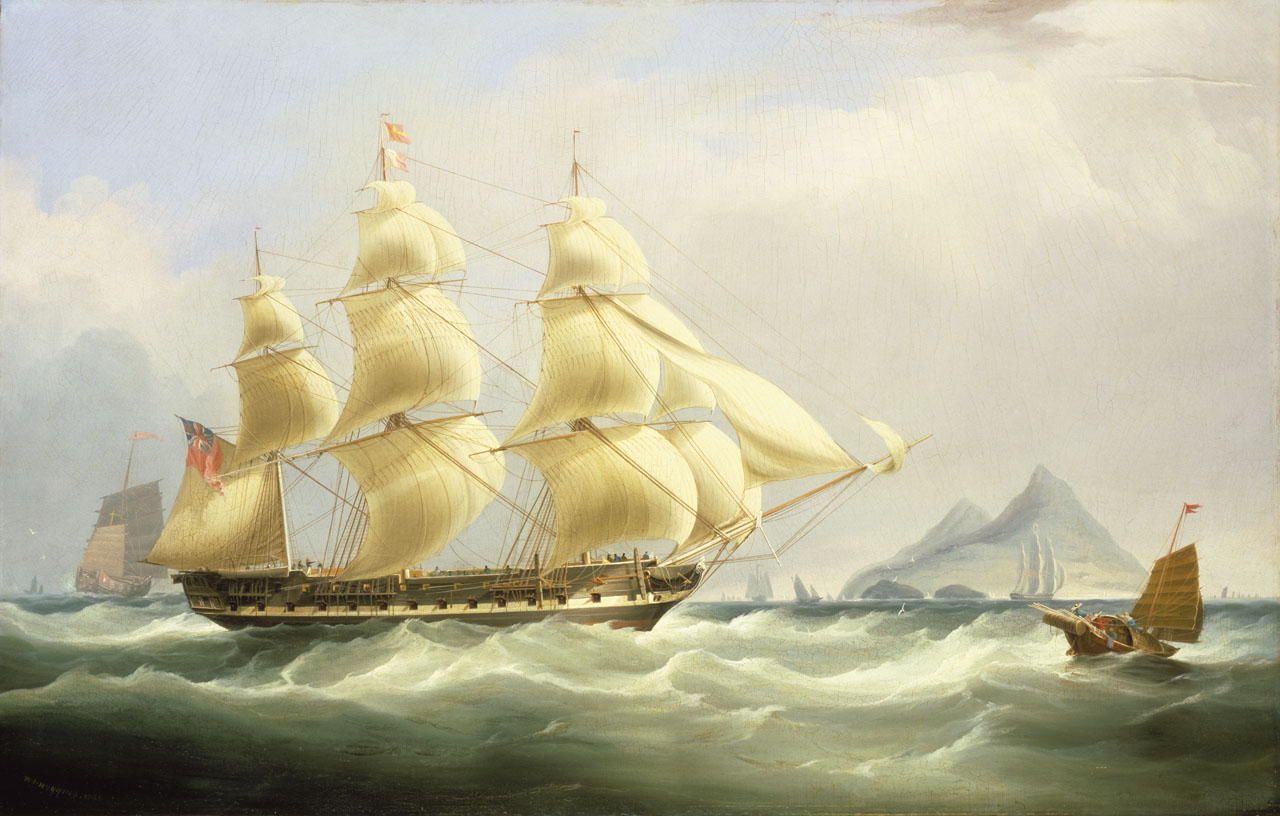
The East Indiaman Asia

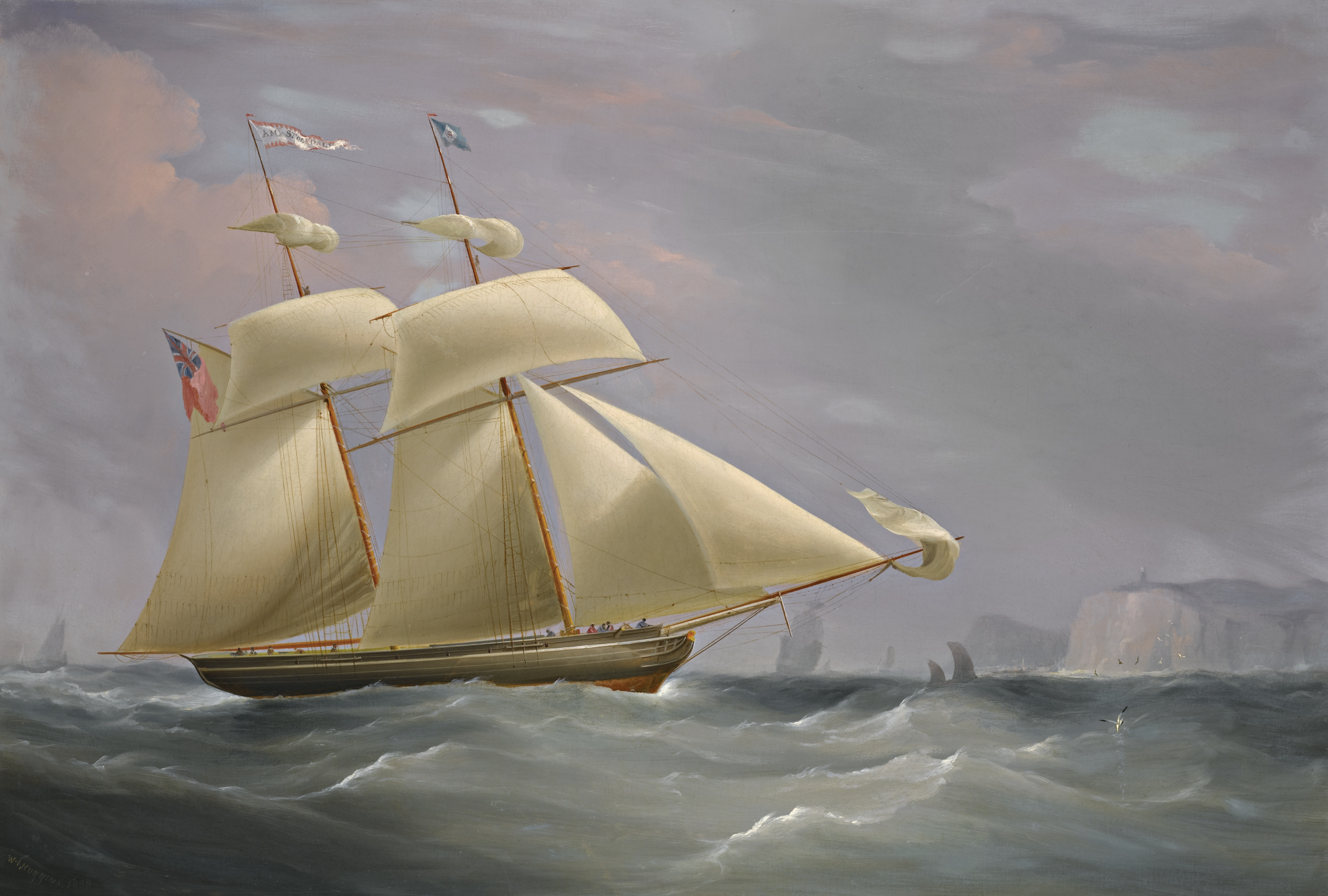
The topsail schooner Amy Stockdale off Dover

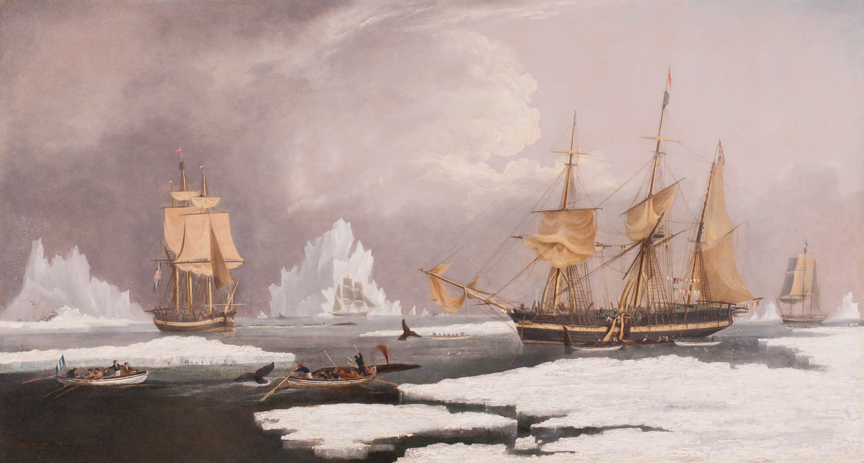
The Northern Whale Fishery 1835
