= Joy (surname) =

Joy is a surname of English origin, derived from the Old French word joie, meaning "joy" or "happiness." Notable people with the surname include:

- Albert Bruce-Joy (1842–1924), Irish sculptor
- Alfred Harrison Joy (1882–1973), American astronomer
- Alice Joy, American singer in vaudeville and on radio
- Anya Taylor-Joy (born 1996), American-born Argentine-British actress
- Benny Joy (1935–1988), American rockabilly musician
- Bernard Joy (1911–1984), English footballer and journalist
- Bill Joy (born 1954), American computer scientist
- Billy Joy (1863–1947), English footballer
- Brian Joy (born 1951), English footballer
- C. Turner Joy (1895–1956), American admiral
- Charles A. Joy (1823–1891), American chemist
- Charles Frederick Joy (1849–1921), U.S. Representative from Missouri
- Charles Frederick Joy (1911–1989), British engineer
- Christian Joy (born 1973), American fashion designer
- Dick Joy (1915–1991) American announcer on radio and television
- Elijah Joy (born 1983), American vegan celebrity chef
- Ernest Joy (1878–1924), American actor
- Ernest Graham Joy (1888–1993), Canadian pilot
- George William Joy (1844–1925), Irish painter
- Gloria Joy (1910–1970), American actress
- Greg Joy (born 1956), Canadian high jumper
- Hélène Joy, Australian-born Canadian actress
- Henry Bourne Joy (1864–1936), American industrialist
- Henry Joy (1766–1838), Anglo-Irish judge
- Ian Joy (born 1981), American soccer player
- John Cantiloe Joy (1806–1866) British marine painter, brother of William Joy
- Joseph Francis Joy (1883–1957), American inventor and founder of Joy Mining Machinery
- Leatrice Joy (1893–1985), American actress
- Lina Joy (born 1964), Malay convert from Islam to Christianity
- Lisa Joy (born 1977), American screenwriter, director, producer, and attorney
- Martha Joy (born 1990), Canadian singer
- Mary Eliza Haweis, née Joy (1848–1898), British author, illustrator and painter
- Megan Joy (born 1985), American singer-songwriter and actress
- Melanie Joy (born 1966), American social psychologist and author
- Michael Joy (disambiguation), several people called Michael or Mike Joy, including
  - Mike Joy, American TV sports announcer
- Nelly Joy, American singer-songwriter
- Norman H. Joy (1874–1953), British coleopterist
- Nykita Joy, American model, makeup artist, and internet celebrity
- Petra Joy (born 1964), German film director
- Rick Joy (born 1958), American architect
- Robert Joy (born 1951), Canadian actor
- Thomas Joy (1610–1678), English carpenter
- Tonie Joy, American musician
- William Joy, (fl. 1310–1348) English master mason
- William Joy (1803–1867), British marine painter, brother of John Cantiloe Joy
