= John Chambers (topographer) =

English topographer, biographer and antiquarian (1780–1839)

John Chambers (1780–1839) was an English antiquarian and topographer.

== Life ==
Born in London in March 1780, Chambers began a career in the office of an architect. Having come into a fortune by the death of his father, he gave up work. In 1806 he became a member of the Society of Arts, and from 1809 to 1811 acted as a chairman of the committee of polite arts. On 29 September 1814 he married Mary, the daughter of Peter Le Neve Foster of Wymondham in Norfolk.

In 1815, the year after his marriage, Chambers left London for Worcester, where he remained for nearly eight years. He moved to his wife's home at Wymondham, and after about two years, settled at Norwich, so that his sons could attend the grammar school there.

Chambers died in Dean's Square, Norwich, on 28 July 1839.

== Works ==
Chambers was the author of the following works:

- A General History of Malvern, Worcester, 1817. Another edition, Worcester, 1820.
- A General History of Worcester, Worcester, 1819.
- Biographical Illustrations of Worcestershire; including Lives of Persons, Natives or Residents, eminent either for Piety or Talent, to which is added a List of Living Authors of the County, Worcester, 1820.
- A General History of the County of Norfolk, intended to convey all the information of a Norfolk Tour, with the more extended details of antiquarian, statistical, pictorial, architectural, and miscellaneous information; including biographical notices, original and selected, 2 vols. Norwich, 1829. This was published anonymously, Chambers having collaborated with Norfolk residents.

Chambers wrote a Life of Inigo Jones for Arnold's Magazine of the Fine Arts, and contributed to the Gentleman's Magazine, and other periodicals.

== Family ==
He left two sons and a daughter. The elder son was John Charles Chambers, vicar of St. Mary's and warden of the House of Charity, Soho, from 1856 until his death in 1874; the younger son, Oswald Lyttleton, became in 1863 vicar of Hook, Yorkshire, where he died in 1883.

== Notes ==
Attribution

This article incorporates text from a publication now in the public domain: Stephen, Leslie, ed. (1887). "Chambers, John (1780-1839)". Dictionary of National Biography. Vol. 10. London: Smith, Elder & Co.
