= Michael Joy =

Michael Joy or Mike Joy may refer to:

- Michael Joy (director), writer and director of 2008 Australian film Men's Group
- Michael Joy (musician), member of KC and the Sunshine Band
- Michael Joy (production designer), production designer of 2007 American TV miniseries Tin Man
- Mike Joy (born 1949), American TV sports announcer
- Mike Joy (freshwater ecologist) (born 1959), New Zealand ecologist and academic
