= Nykita Joy =

American TikToker and model

- Occupations: Internet personality; makeup artist; model

Instagram information
- Page: Nykita Joy
- Followers: 81.4 K

TikTok information
- Page: neoitgirl
- Followers: 1.1M
- Last updated: September 28, 2026

Nykita Joy is an American TikToker, makeup artist, and model.

== Biography ==
Joy began creating content on TikTok and Instagram after losing access to a gender affirming surgery, at which time she advertised tarot readings and posted daily affirmations. She eventually shifted her online focus to makeup and beauty content.

She posts "Get Ready With Me" videos, makeup and haircare tutorials, and personal experiences and community struggles as a transgender woman. Joy also works as a model and was in a campaign for Milk Makeup.

In 2023, Joy was involved in the launch of the "Gender Euphoria: A Global Celebration" virtual event in honor of International Transgender Day of Visibility. The event raised money for Strands For Trans charity. In September 2023, she was recognized at Versace's Icons Dinner at the Rockefeller Center.
