= Lound =

Lound may refer to:

== People ==
- Thomas Lound (1801–1861), British painter of landscapes

== Places ==
- Lound, Lincolnshire, England
- Lound, Nottinghamshire, England
- Lound, Suffolk, England
