= John Middleton (Norfolk artist) =

English landscape painter (1827–1856)

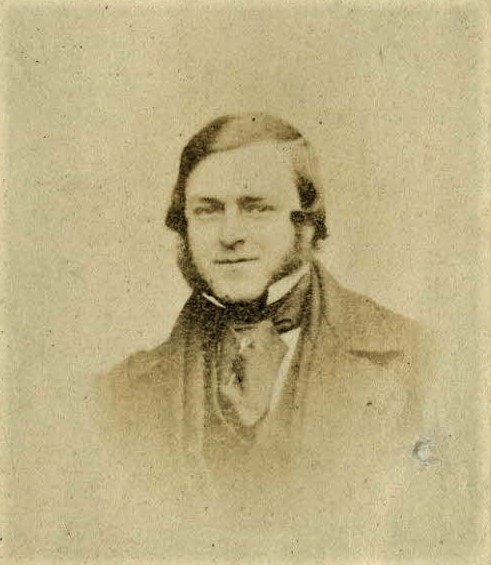
- Born: 9 January 1827; Norwich
- Died: 11 November 1856 (aged 29); Norwich
- Resting place: Earlham Road Cemetery, Norwich; 52.6324°N 1.2673°E
- Known for: Landscape painting
- Movement: Norwich School of painters

John Middleton (9 January 1827 – 11 November 1856) was an English artist known for his accomplished watercolour paintings. He was the youngest and the last important member of the Norwich School of painters, which was the first provincial art movement in Britain. As well as being a talented etcher, he produced oil paintings and was an enthusiastic amateur photographer.

Middleton's father, also named John, was a Norwich glass stainer. His mother painted plants and twice exhibited her work with the Norwich Society of Artists. Middleton was educated in Norwich and studied art under the landscape painters John Berney Ladbrooke and Henry Bright. He first exhibited his paintings before the age of 20, and went on to show paintings at both the Royal Academy and the British Institution. Many of his works have been acclaimed by art historians for their masterly tonal values, confidence and freshness, which gives them a more modern appearance in comparison with the sometimes over-detailed works of other Victorian painters.

Middleton's death in 1856 from tuberculosis, which cut short his career at the age of 29, has been described by the art historian Josephine Walpole as "the supreme tragedy for the Norwich School of painters".

== Background ==
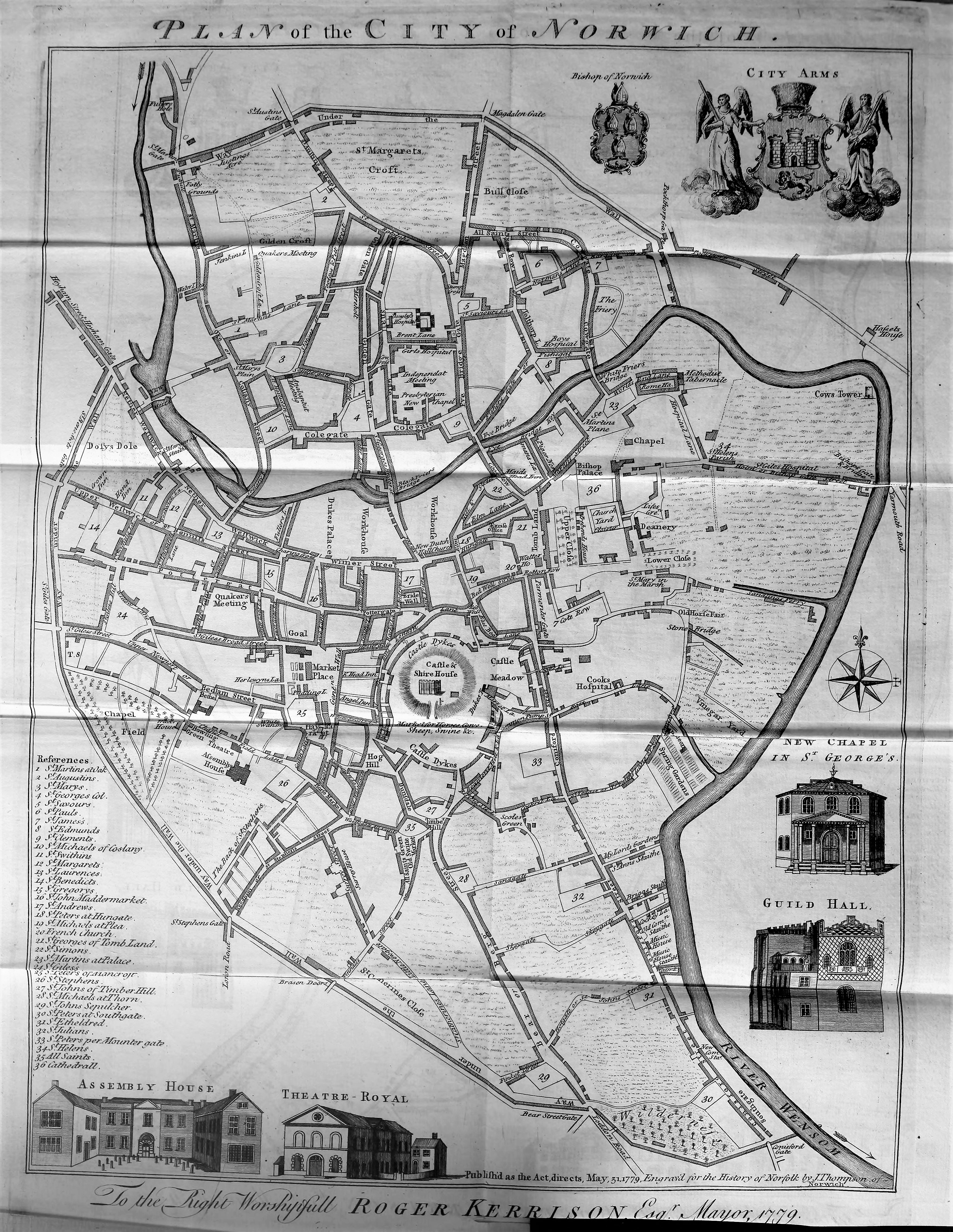
A 1780s map of Norwich. Its street pattern was one that the artists of the Norwich School, including Middleton, would have known well.

The Norwich School of painters, which included John Middleton, was a group connected by geographical location, the depiction of Norwich and rural Norfolk, and by close personal and professional relationships. The school's most important artists were John Crome, Joseph Stannard, George Vincent, Robert Ladbrooke, James Stark, John Thirtle and John Sell Cotman, along with Cotman's sons Miles Edmund and John Joseph Cotman, and Middleton himself. The Norwich School was a unique phenomenon in the history of 19th-century British art. Norwich was the first English city outside London where a school of artists arose, creating the first provincial art movement in Britain. It had more local-born artists than any subsequently-formed school elsewhere. Norwich's theatrical, artistic, philosophical and musical cultures were cross-fertilised in a way that was unique outside London.

Within the Norwich School was the Norwich Society of Artists, founded in 1803. It arose from the need for a group of Norwich artists to teach each other and their pupils. Though not all of the members of the Norwich School were also members of the Norwich Society, the latter was key in establishing the artists' associations with each other. Its stated aims were "to conduct an Enquiry into the Rise, Progress and Present State of Painting, Archaeology and Sculpture with a view to point out the Best Methods of Study to attain to Greater Perfection in these Arts". It held regular exhibitions and had an organised structure, showing works annually until 1825 and again from 1828 until it was dissolved in 1833. The leading spirits and finest artists of the movement were Crome and Cotman.

Middleton, who was too young to have had any association with the Norwich Society of Artists, was the last great watercolourist of the Norwich School and the most gifted of the school's third generation of artists. His works provided, according to Andrew Moore, the former Keeper of Art at the Norwich Castle Museum & Art Gallery, "a distinguished coda to the spirit of his immediate contemporaries and the artists of the first generation, John Sell Cotman and John Crome".

Interest in the Norwich School declined during the 1830s, but the school's reputation rose after the Royal Academy's 1878 Winter Exhibition. By the end of the century, however, its paintings—once regarded as modern and progressive—were seen as belonging to a bygone age. This has been attributed by the art professor Andrew Hemingway to the "mythology of rural Englishness" that prevailed at the start of the 20th century. He has commented on a lack of analysis of the Norwich School, such as connections between the Norwich School painters and other artists and developments in landscape painting during the 19th century.

== Life ==
=== Early life and training ===
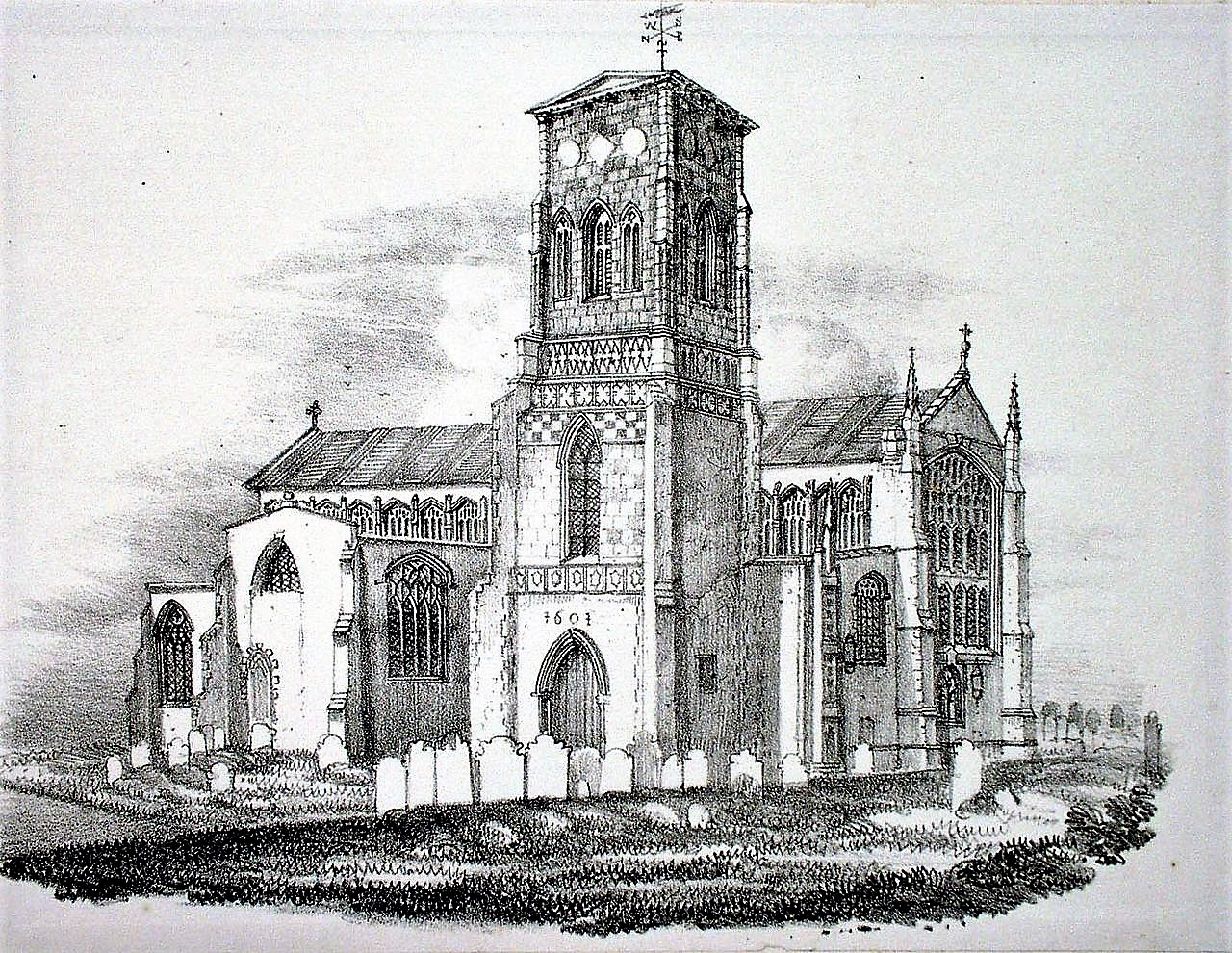
John Berney Ladbrooke, St Stephen's Church (undated), Norfolk Museums Collections

Parish records show that John Middleton was born in Norwich on 9 January 1827 and was baptised on 14 January at St Stephen's Church, by his parents John Middleton and Ann Bayfield. (Note: John Middleton "of St Stephen in the City of Norwich" married Ann Bayfield on 13 December 1825 at the parish church of St James with Pockthorpe, Norwich. Middleton's mother is variously given by different sources as either Ann or Mary. John Middleton hardly knew his birth mother, who died when he was young: he referred to his step-mother Mary Middleton as his mother.) Little of his early childhood has been documented and his biographers do not mention any siblings, although the Middletons' memorial in St Stephen's Church includes an unnamed daughter who died in infancy. (Note: A child called Ann was born 10 November 1828, the daughter of John Middleton, a painter, and his wife Ann, both of the parish of St Stephen's. The child died two days later.) Some of the family's relatives in Norwich were blacksmiths and weavers, but John Middleton senior was a glass stainer. He was the business successor of Daniel Coppin, one of the founding members of the Norwich Society of Artists. In addition to running a glass colouring business, Middleton senior undertook plumbing and painting work, and studied and collected ferns in his spare time. His wife specialised in painting plants, and as 'Mrs. J. Middleton' exhibited two pictures with the Norwich Society: Cactus Speciocissimus, flowered in the greenhouse of Mr. C. Middleton, April 1828 and Georgina, or Dahlias from Nature (1829). (Note: Papers now kept at the Norfolk Record Office show that John Middleton's grandfather was Charles Middleton, the 'Mr. C. Middleton' mentioned in the title of Ann Middleton's painting.) Ann Middleton died in Norwich on 1 January 1830, aged 29.

Middleton was educated at Norwich Grammar School. Upon the completion of his formal education he became the pupil of the landscape painter John Berney Ladbrooke, who referred to "my pupil John Middleton" in a letter dated 11 February 1850. Ladbrooke, a Norwich School artist who produced a large output of works despite having to earn a living as a drawing master, particularly influenced Middleton's oil technique.

Middleton was taught by Henry Bright, whom he visited in London in 1847. Middleton moved to the capital at this time, living at 1, The Terrace, Kensington. From 1847 to 1849 he was both the pupil and friend of Bright, probably travelling with him on a trip to Kent.

Following his father's death in April 1848, (Note: According to the Norfolk News, John Middleton's father John died at 63, St Stephen's Street, on 6 April 1848, aged 61. His age is given as 60 on his memorial tablet in St Stephen's Church.) Middleton moved back to Norwich in order to take over the running of the family business. (Note: According to papers held at the Norfolk Record Office, the St Stephen's Street premises were sold by Mary Middleton after her stepson's death.) His duties as a businessman both interrupted his training and acted to reduce his artistic output. In 1850 he moved with his step-mother from their house adjoining the business to a much larger house in Surrey Street, around the corner from the business in St Stephen's Street. (Note: The 1851 census of England and Wales recorded the Middleton family at Surrey Street, Norwich. The unmarried John Middleton was at home on census night with his "Mother-in-Law", named as 51-year-old Mary Middleton, along with three servants.)

=== Artistic career and friendships ===
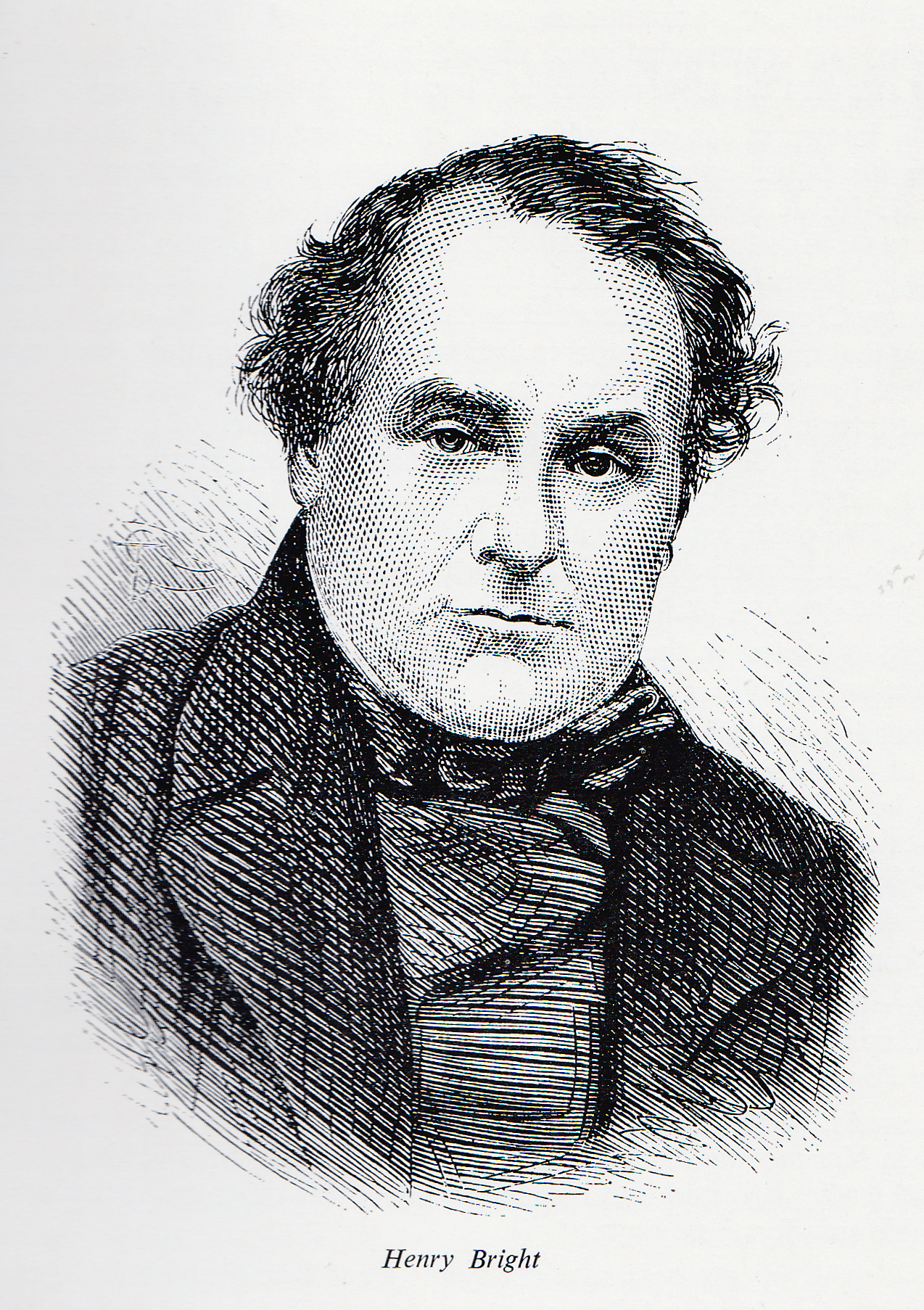
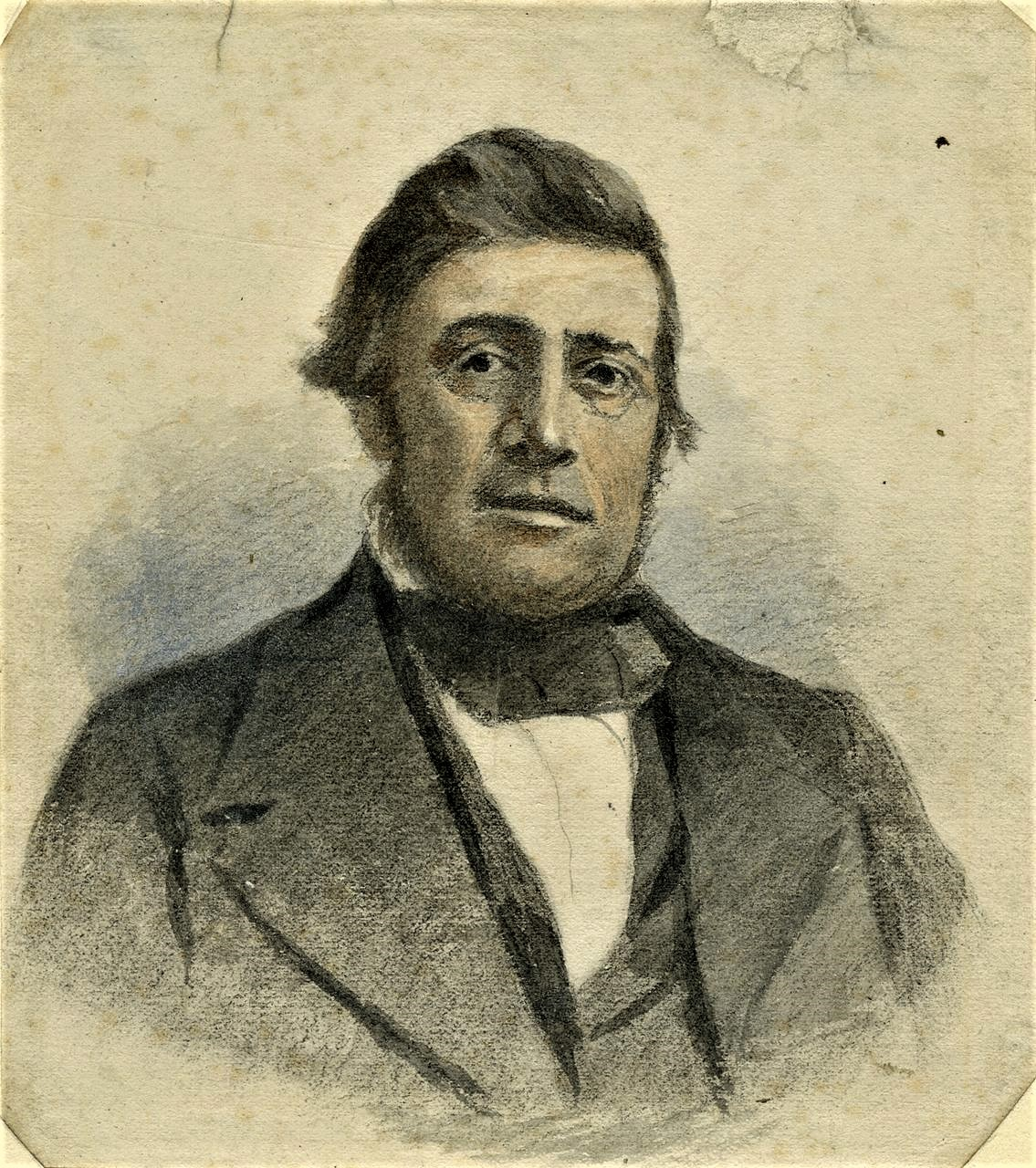
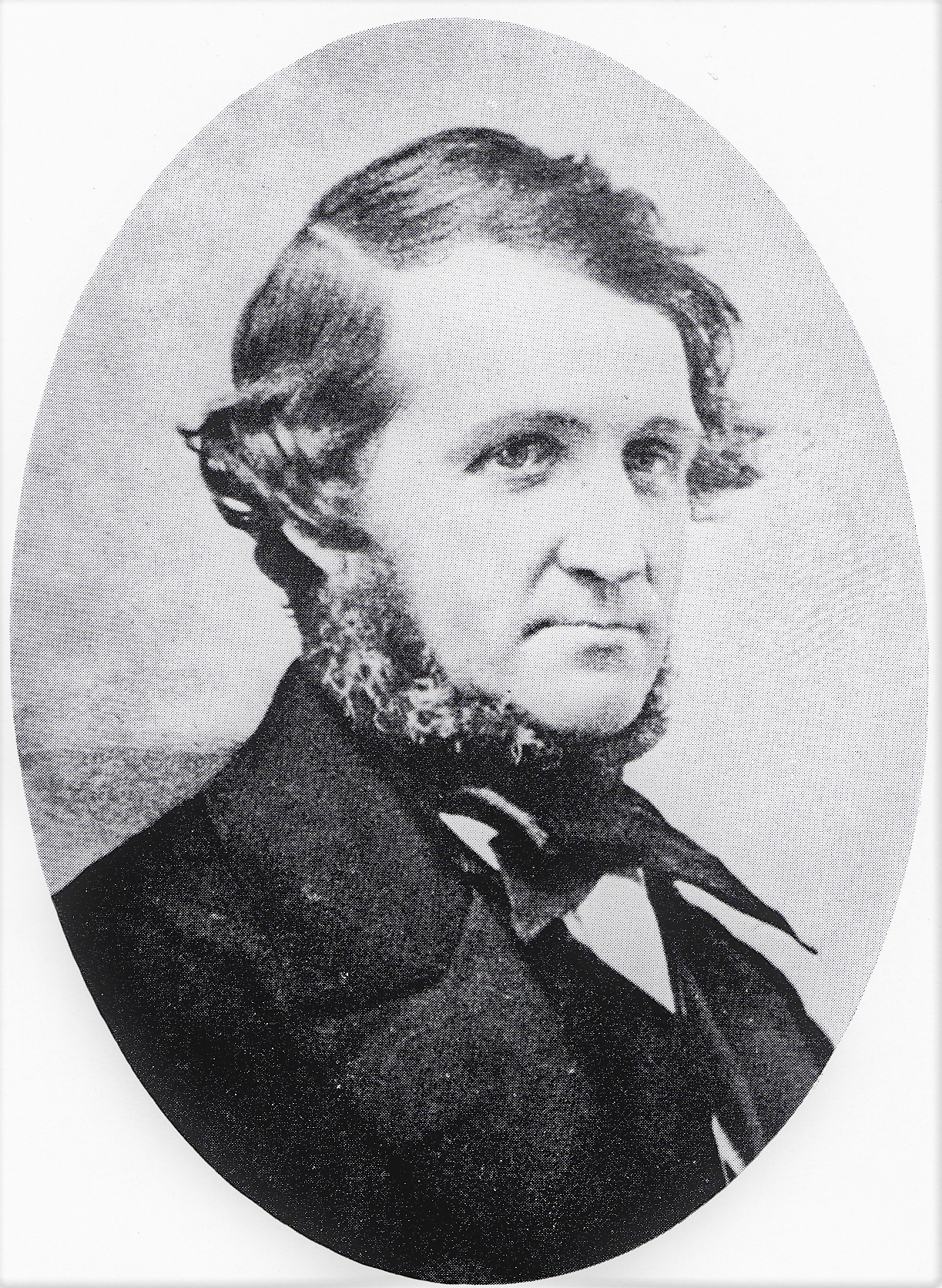
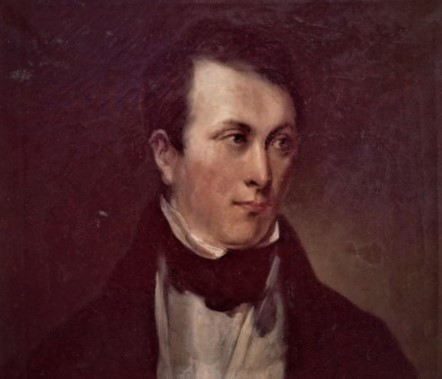
Middleton's close artistic friends. Clockwise from upper left: Henry Bright, Thomas Lound, William J.J. Bolding, Robert Leman.

Middleton was a precocious artist, exhibiting before he was 20. He exhibited in London from 1847 to 1855, despite the interruption caused by his business commitments in Norwich: he showed 14 pictures at the Royal Academy and 15 at the British Institution, where his work was acclaimed. (Note: The 29 works by Middleton that he exhibited in London from 1847 to 1855 can be found in Dickes' Norwich School of painting. See also List of artworks by John Middleton.)

Middleton's artistic output was influenced by (and in turn had an influence upon) the works of Henry Bright, Thomas Lound and Robert Leman. The four artists were very good friends.

According to the author and art historian William Frederick Dickes, Middleton was the devoted young friend of Lound, who probably introduced him to the works of Thirtle, as well as to photography. Lound lived and worked in Norwich as a brewer clerk and an insurance agent, and his wealth allowed him to pursue his enthusiasm for collecting, copying, and producing art. He was especially passionate about Thirtle's paintings. Along with Middleton, Bright and Leman, Lound was a member of the Committee of the Norfolk and Norwich Association for the Promotion of the Fine Arts (1848–1852). A central figure in the history of the Norwich School watercolour painters, the remaining Norwich artists depended on the leadership of Lound (and Leman) for three decades after the demise of the Norwich Society of Artists in 1833.

Middleton befriended William Johnson Jennis Bolding, a resident landowner and farmer in the coastal village of Weybourne. Bolding, known for his pioneering photographs of Norfolk landscapes and estate workers, is regarded as an important early photographer. Middleton was responsible for enrolling him as a member of the Norwich Photographic Society, which held exhibitions that included William Bolding's work. (Note: The following excerpts of a letter written on 12 March 1854 from John Middleton to William Bolding, in which Middleton informs him that he has enrolled him as a member of the Photographic Society, also gives an indication of their friendship: My Dear Sir, Enclosed is a note from Owen about the Great Ex. series of pictures – you will see by this he would charge you 2/6 each taking the series – I think this rather high but I suppose it does not answer his purpose to do them for less – you will send me a line if you wish to have them and I will write to Owen – or I can send you his address and you can correspond with him. The Photographic Society met on Friday night and I enrolled you as a member and paid 5 shillings – 18 members have joined on there appears every chance of success – I am one of the Committee – therefore can tell you of our proceedings… …Muskett has no more Cossey views – but will order some. I told him nothing but the best impressions would do…Remember me to all at home who I hope are well. Yours very truly, John Middleton.) Bolding was also a talented artist who exhibited two oil paintings in 1853. The two friends sketched together, with Middleton often staying at Weybourne, and some of Bolding's landscape photographs have an affinity with Middleton's watercolour technique. A small etching by John Middleton, made en plein air, closely resembles a photograph by Bolding, showing that the friends were working together. Some of Bolding's landscape photographs that show trees, and trees near water, were photographed with a typical Middleton-like composition, with one particular image containing many of the ingredients found in Middleton's watercolours, such as trees, water, fences and a gate.

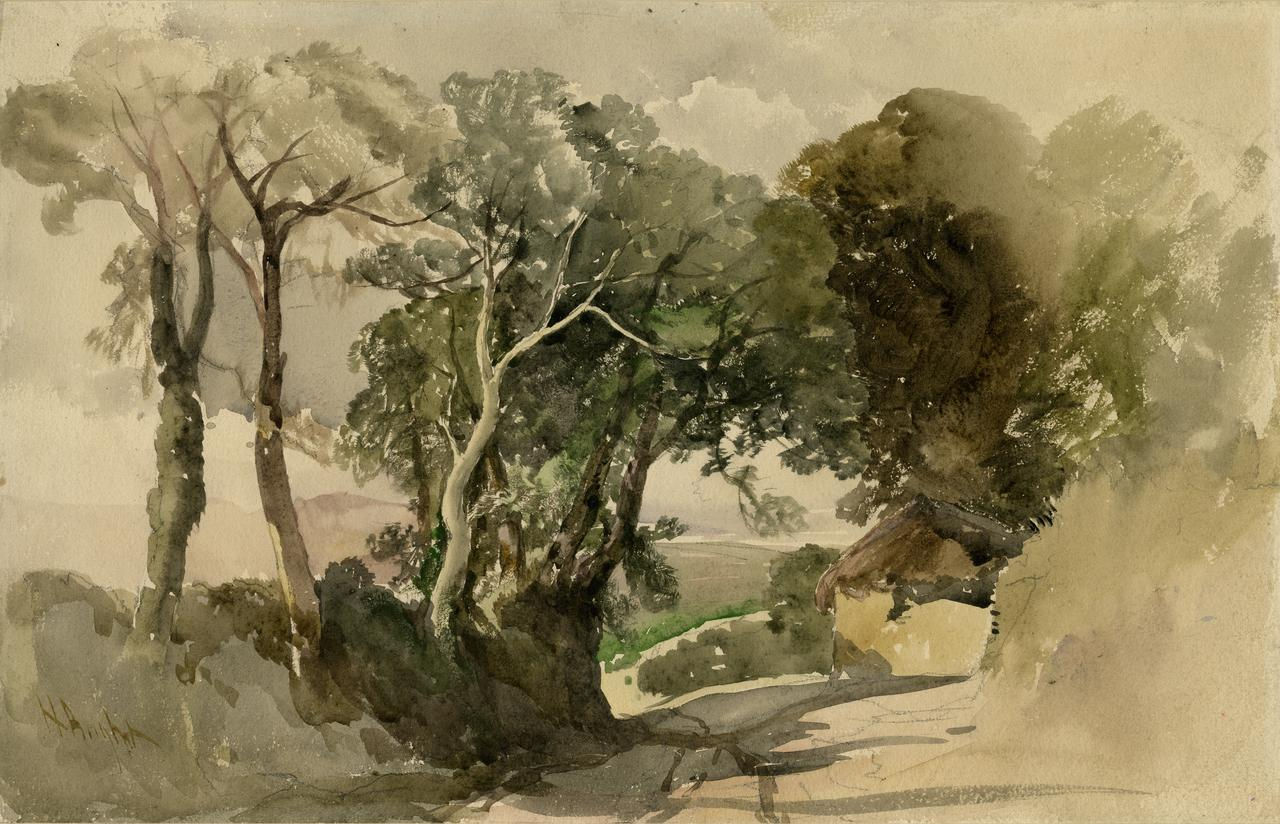
Henry Bright, Lane over the Hill (undated)

Although Henry Bright was Middleton's teacher, the outstanding watercolours Bright produced in the 1840s made after a sketching tour of Kent, when he was possibly accompanied by Middleton, show clearly how he was influenced by his pupil. It often difficult to distinguish between the two artists. According to the art historian Francis Cheetham, Lane over the Hill shows Bright's capacity to "use watercolour with (the) freshness and simplicity which characterises the finest work of John Middleton". Their friendship was not always smooth: in a letter of 22 February 1850 to Thomas Lound's son, Bright wrote, "J. Middleton dined here tonight, he was wondrous polite. Tell your good papa that my Lecture did him good."

Middleton travelled to various parts of Britain during his working life. As well as spending time sketching and painting during an excursion to Tunbridge Wells in Kent, he produced paintings of the area around Clovelly during a visit to the Devon coast. Included amongst works he exhibited in London were Scene near Tunbridge Wells (1847) and Clovelly, on the coast of Devonshire (1851). Whilst in London he and other members of the Norwich School attended the evening meetings of the Graphic Society of Painters and Engravers. He became a member of the Society in 1854, but resigned in 1856, shortly before his death.

=== Decline and death ===
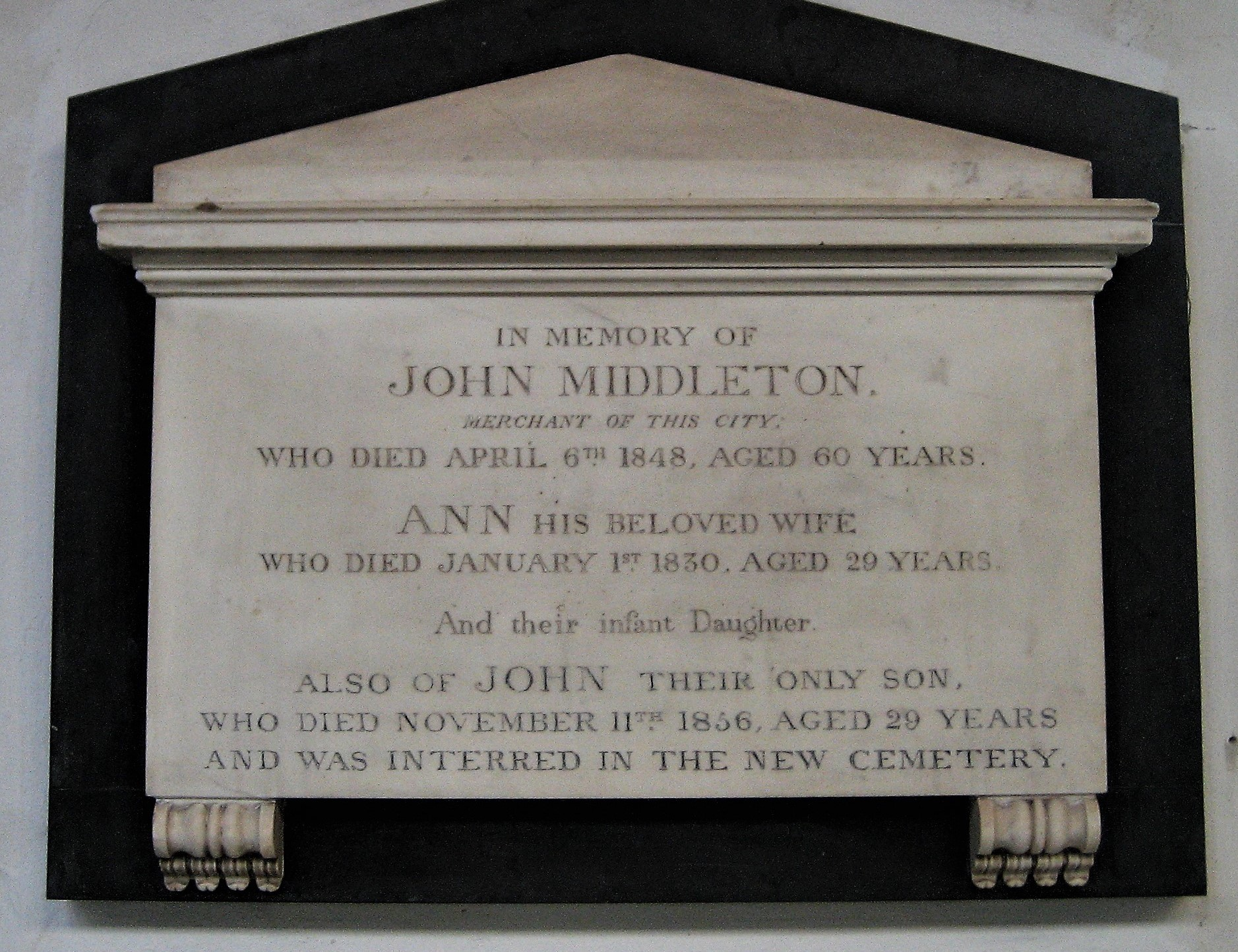
St Stephen's Church

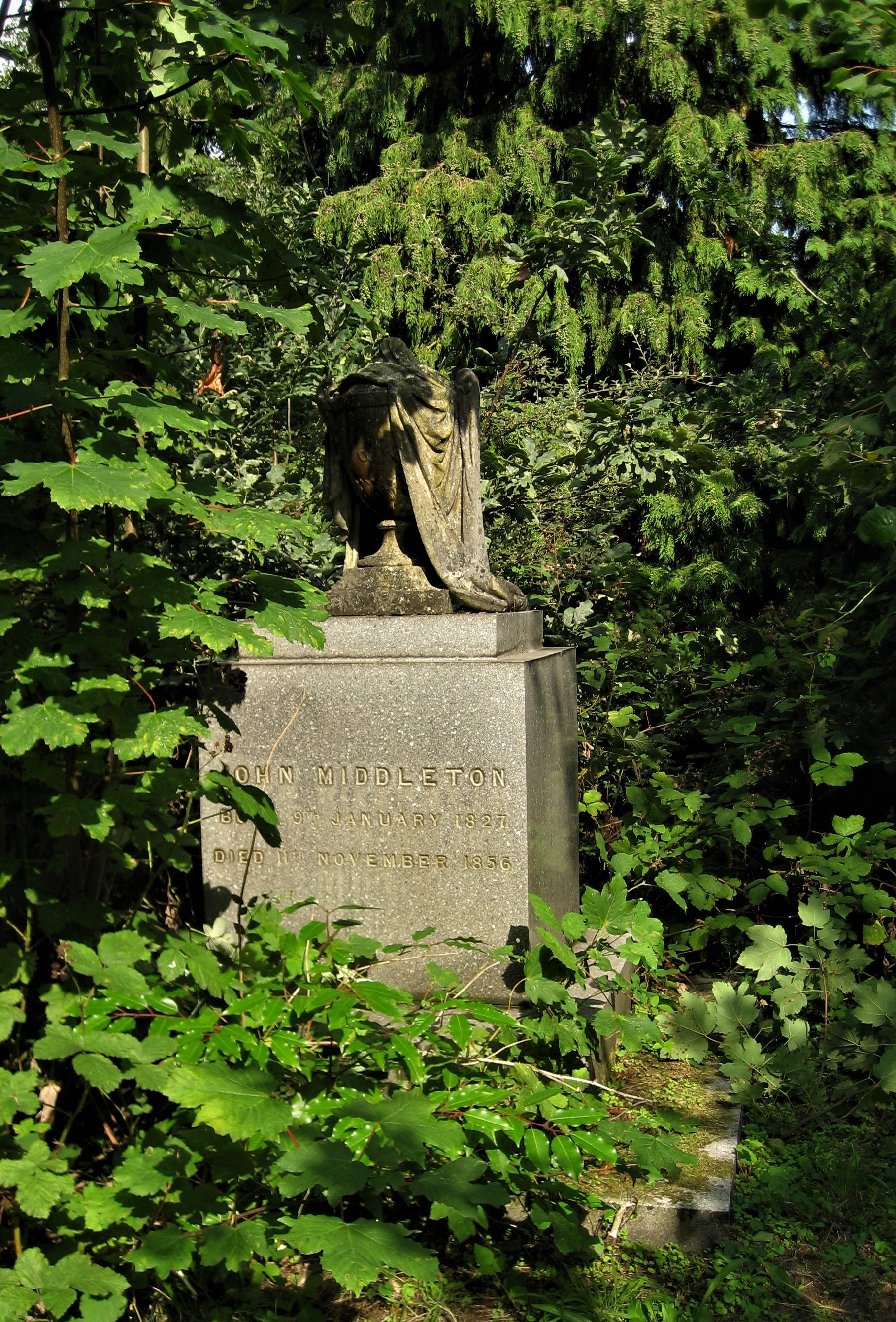
Earlham Cemetery

During much of his life Middleton suffered from poor health. He became consumptive and was forced to work outdoors less and less as his illness advanced. The art historian Derek Clifford noted that Middleton's inspiration, brilliant colours and confidence in his drawings tailed away after 1848, four years before his last known drawings were made.

Middleton died of tuberculosis at his home at 29, Surrey Street, Norwich, on 11 November 1856. He was buried in the new cemetery at Earlham. (Note: Earlham Cemetery opened in 1856, following a ruling from the Government that burials in Norwich's churchyards could no longer be permitted.) His obituary in the local Norfolk press noted that "he painted nature just as he found her in the quiet sequestered nooks which abound in this county, and many a spot, otherwise of little note, will live long on the canvas touched by Middleton’s hand". His will, which was proved in Norwich in July 1857, stipulated that Mary Middleton should inherit both the family business and the remaining funds from the estate. From his estate, which was assessed at under £30,000, he provided for his servants, his relatives and to charities, including the Norfolk and Norwich Hospital, which received £100.

The art historian Josephine Walpole believes that "the supreme tragedy for the Norwich School was the death of John Middleton at the age of only 29" and that the later works of the most gifted of the school's watercolour artists only "lost their fire and life" because of the debilitating effect of his illness. According to Hemingway, Middleton's death in 1856 marked a decline in the quality of painting produced in the region, and he was the last significant watercolourist to be based in East Anglia.

== Works ==
There is no published catalogue raisonné of John Middleton's drawings, pictures or photographs. An idea of his artistic output can be obtained from the catalogue of a sale of his works that took place in June 1883, following the death of Mary Middleton earlier that year. On sale were 108 sketches (including a series made by Middleton when he was Ladbrooke's pupil), 108 pencil drawings, 4 sketch books, more than 40 etchings, 63 watercolour paintings, 11 oils and 20 oil painting sketches.

=== Watercolours, oil paintings and etchings ===
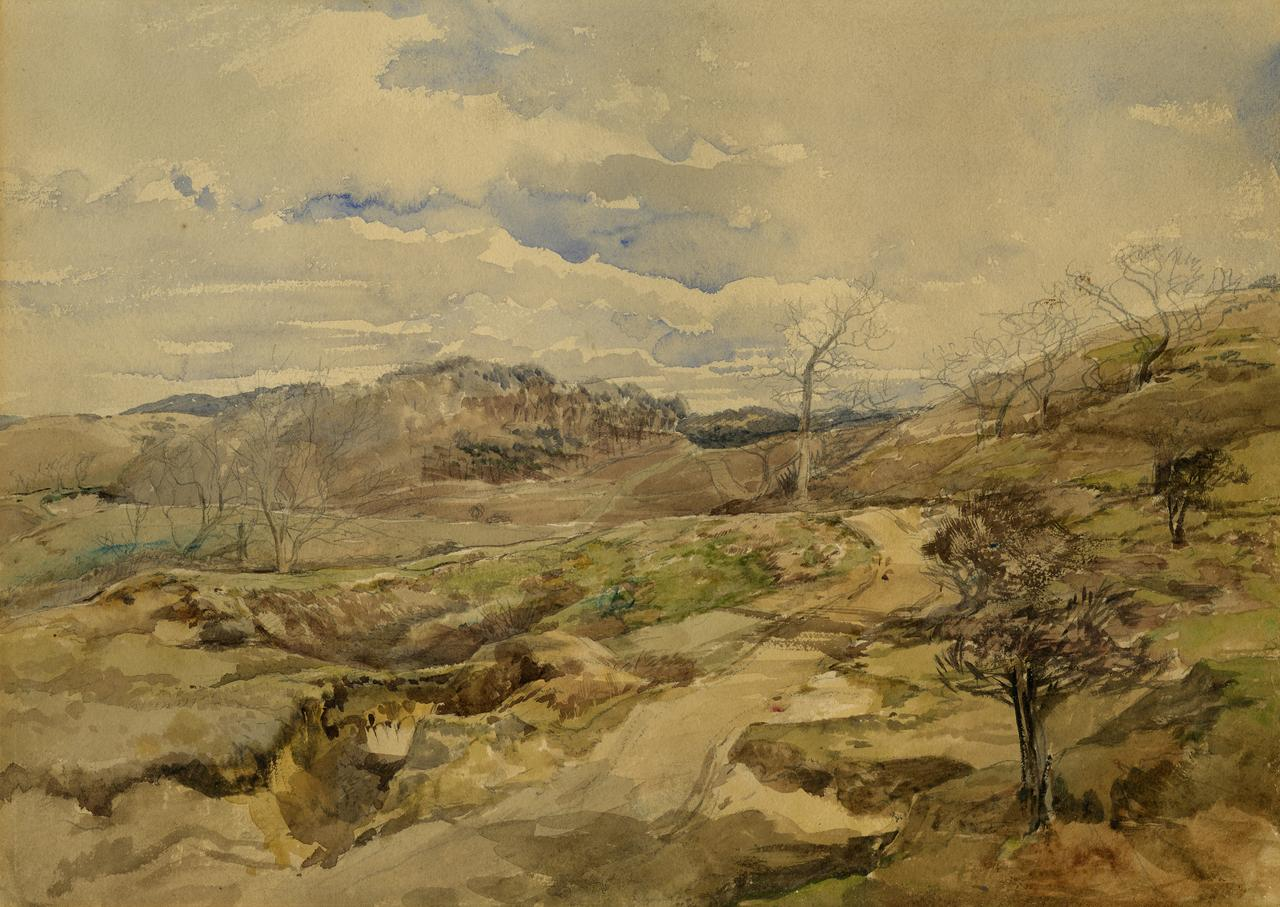
At Weybourne – a study in March on the Norfolk Coast (1852), Norfolk Museums Collections

John Middleton was a highly talented watercolourist, who according to Clifford, was the most successful of all the Norwich School artists working in this medium during the late 1840s, with the possible exception of John Sell Cotman. Middleton produced works using clear colours and incisively-outlined forms, boldly using the white of his paper and being, in Clifford's words, "delighted in the potentialities of his medium". The author Robert Brall considers Middleton's best paintings to have an "astonishingly modern" look, as opposed to contemporary works of the period that were elaborately detailed. Brall notes that Middleton's later works, painted from 1850, were more laboured and lacked much of the fresh and spontaneous appearance of his earlier works, probably because of a growing public interest in art that contained fine detail and an elaborate 'finished' look'.

In 1905, Dickes described Middleton as a painstaking and energetic artist. The 1894 Dictionary of National Biography noted his "effective rendering of the seasons of the year, especially the early spring". In more recent decades, historians have also admired Middleton's talents. Walpole has assessed his approach to his work as being more advanced than that of his contemporaries Robert Leman and Thomas Lound. Commentators have praised his ability to show tone in his paintings. According to Walpole, Middleton's "exquisite use of light and shade enhances the mastery of tonal values", a comment that echoes the Norfolk Chronicle′s report of 11 December 1847, which described his "charming use of light and shade".

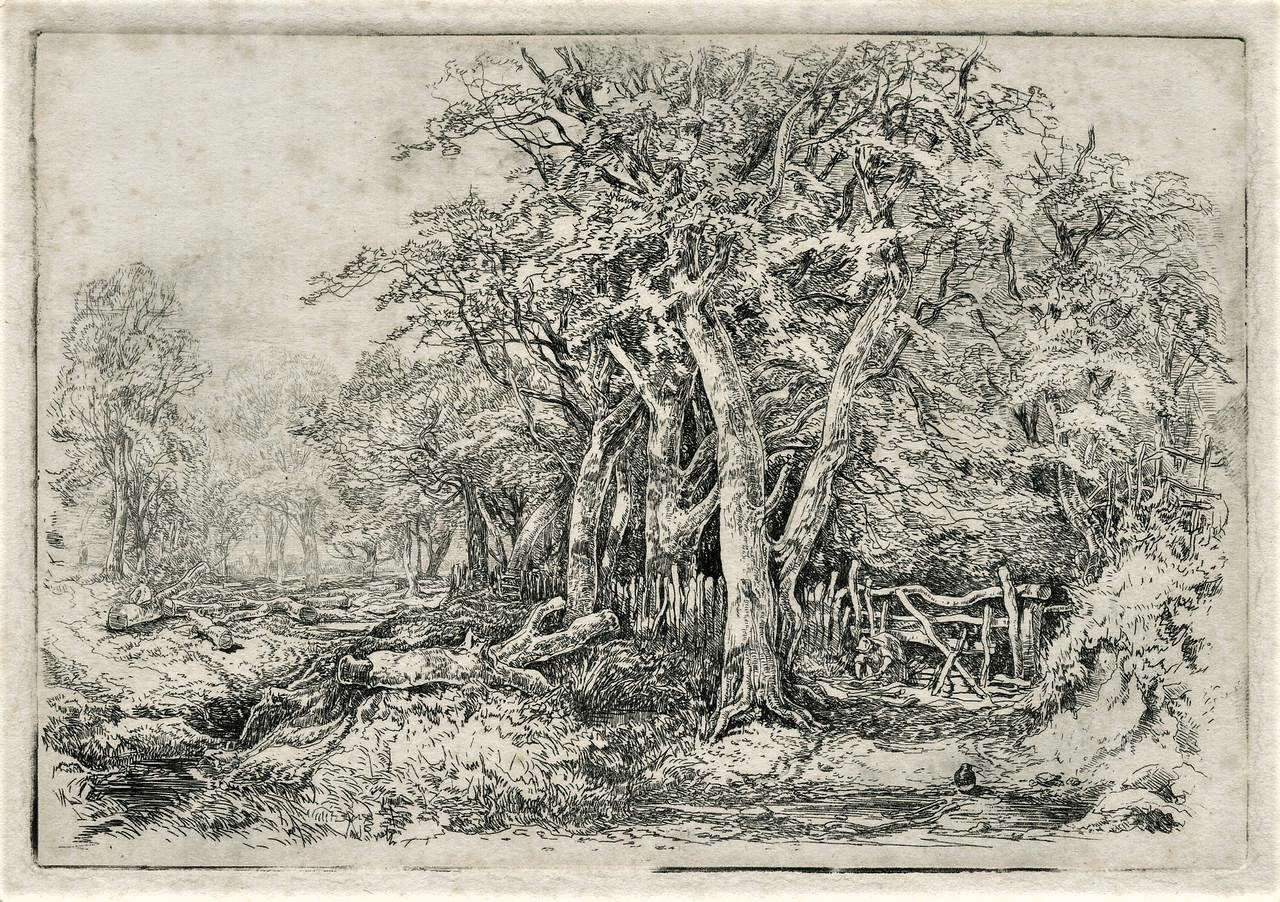
View at Gunton (undated etching), Norfolk Museums Collections

Middleton's etchings required a different technique from his watercolours: their delicacy and intricacy are said by the author Geoffrey Searle to resemble the work of John Crome. In contrast to Middleton's watercolours, his etchings are mostly depictions of wooded landscapes, ranging in tone from those that are heavily inked, to others with a light, silvery touch and delicate lines. None of them depict human figures. A set was published separately in 1852 as Nine Etchings by John Middleton, now held at the British Museum and Norwich Castle. He also painted in oils, but little has been written of his oil paintings, whose subject matter was similar to his watercolours and which displayed a similar immediacy of execution.

=== Photographic work ===
Middleton took a great interest in photography and was an early committee member of the Norwich Photographic Society, which was formed in 1854. He was one of the earliest artists to use his own camera as an aid to producing his watercolour landscapes, working in the medium whilst it was still in its infancy. Like Lound, who was also a keen amateur photographer, he could afford to possess his own photographic equipment, which at that time only the wealthy could access.

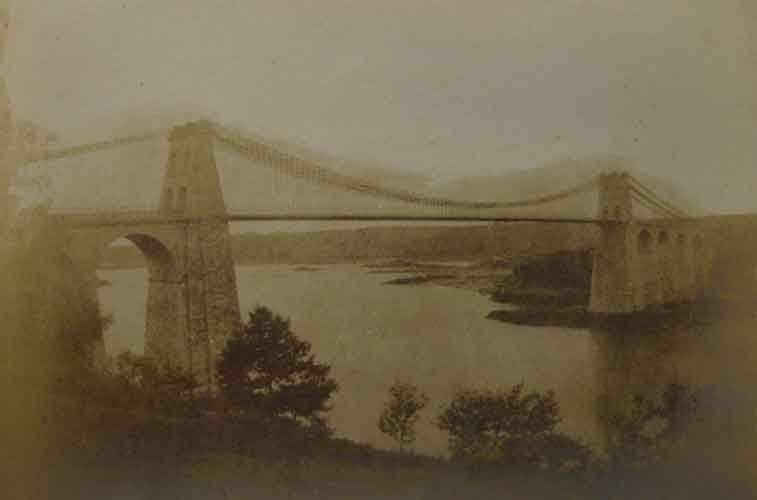
Middleton's 1850s photograph of the Menai Bridge

Middleton used waxed paper negatives to produce images of the Norfolk countryside. It is not known if he sold prints of his photographs or if he ever displayed them in any major exhibition, and the only photographs that can be attributed to him are a group made during a trip to North Wales. These images of landscapes, such as his photograph of the Menai Bridge, are reminiscent in their contrasting dark and light tones of the large paintings produced by Bright in the late 1840s, such as Study of a Beech Tree.

Norwich's photographic community, centered around Thomas Damant Eaton (c. 1799–1871), was particularly active during the 1850s. During this period a close relationship existed between the artistic community and Norfolk photographers. An indication of this relationship was a major exhibition of works by both the Norfolk and Norwich Arts Association and the Norwich Photographic Society from November 1856 to February 1857, in which 500 photographs and 425 works of art were shown. It took place only four years after the first large public exhibition of photographs in the world. Middleton died shortly before the Norwich exhibition was opened, and its catalogue shows that none of his works were shown.

=== Exhibitions and sales ===
Middleton's works have been included in fine art exhibitions in both London and Norwich:

- Exhibitions of the Norfolk and Norwich Association for the Promotion of the Fine Arts (1848, 1849, 1852, 1853 and 1855)
- British Institution exhibitions (1847–1855)
- Royal Academy exhibitions (1847–1855)
- Exhibition of the Works of Deceased Local Artists, Norfolk and Norwich Fine Arts Association (1860)
- Norwich and Eastern Counties Working Classes Industrial Exhibition (1867)
- British Medical Association Loan Collection (1874)
- Norwich Art Loan Exhibition, Church of St Peter Mancroft Restoration Fund (1878 and 1885)
- Fine Art Exhibition, in aid of the new Norfolk and Norwich Hospital (1883)
- Loan Collection of Drawings in the New Picture Gallery, Norwich Castle (1903)
- Exhibition of Norwich School Pictures, Norwich Castle Museum (October 1927)
- Exhibition at the Bankside Gallery in London from 25 May to 27 June 1982

Few of Middleton's paintings can be seen on public display outside the Norwich area. Several of his works have been sold at auction. His undated At Gunton Park (33 x 47.6 cm), which was sold at Chiswick Auctions in 2018, fetched £3,500. The etching At Hatfield (11 x 16.3 cm) was sold by Keys in 2016, for £120. A shady lane, Tunbridge Wells, Kent realised £6,675 at Christie's in London in July 2012, whilst another watercolour, An old cottage at Tunbridge Wells, Kent, realised £18,000 when sold there in 2007.

=== Gallery ===
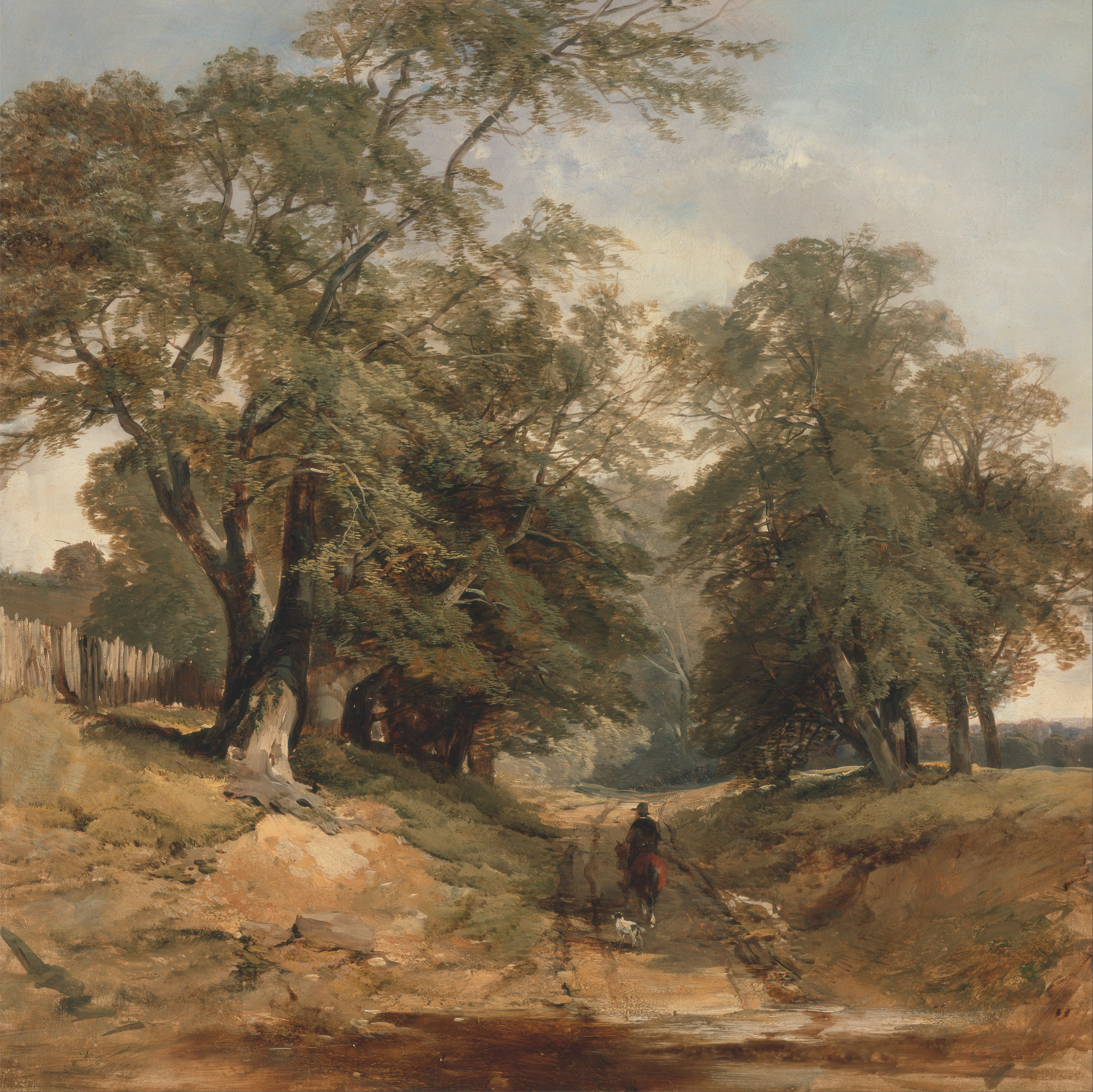
A Landscape with a Horseman (c. 1850), Yale Center for British Art

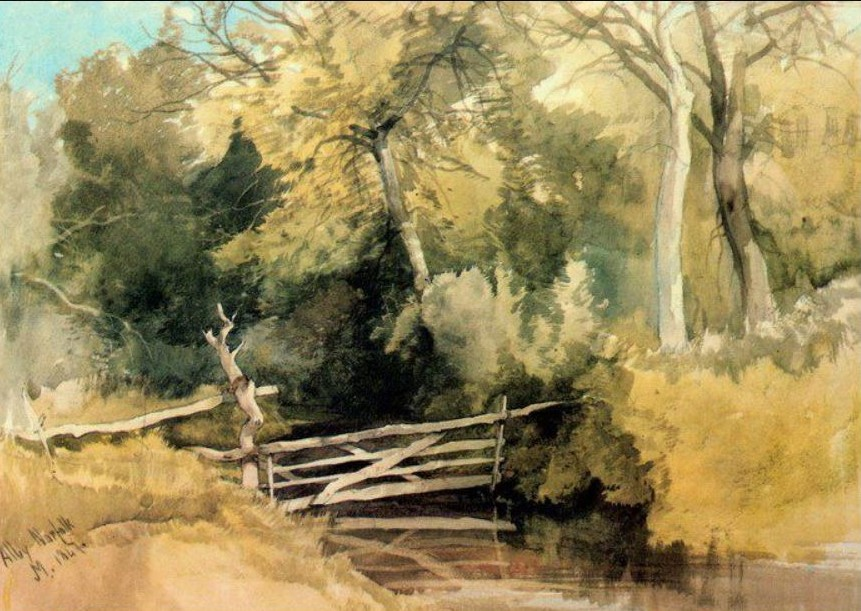
Alby (1847), Norwich Museums Collections

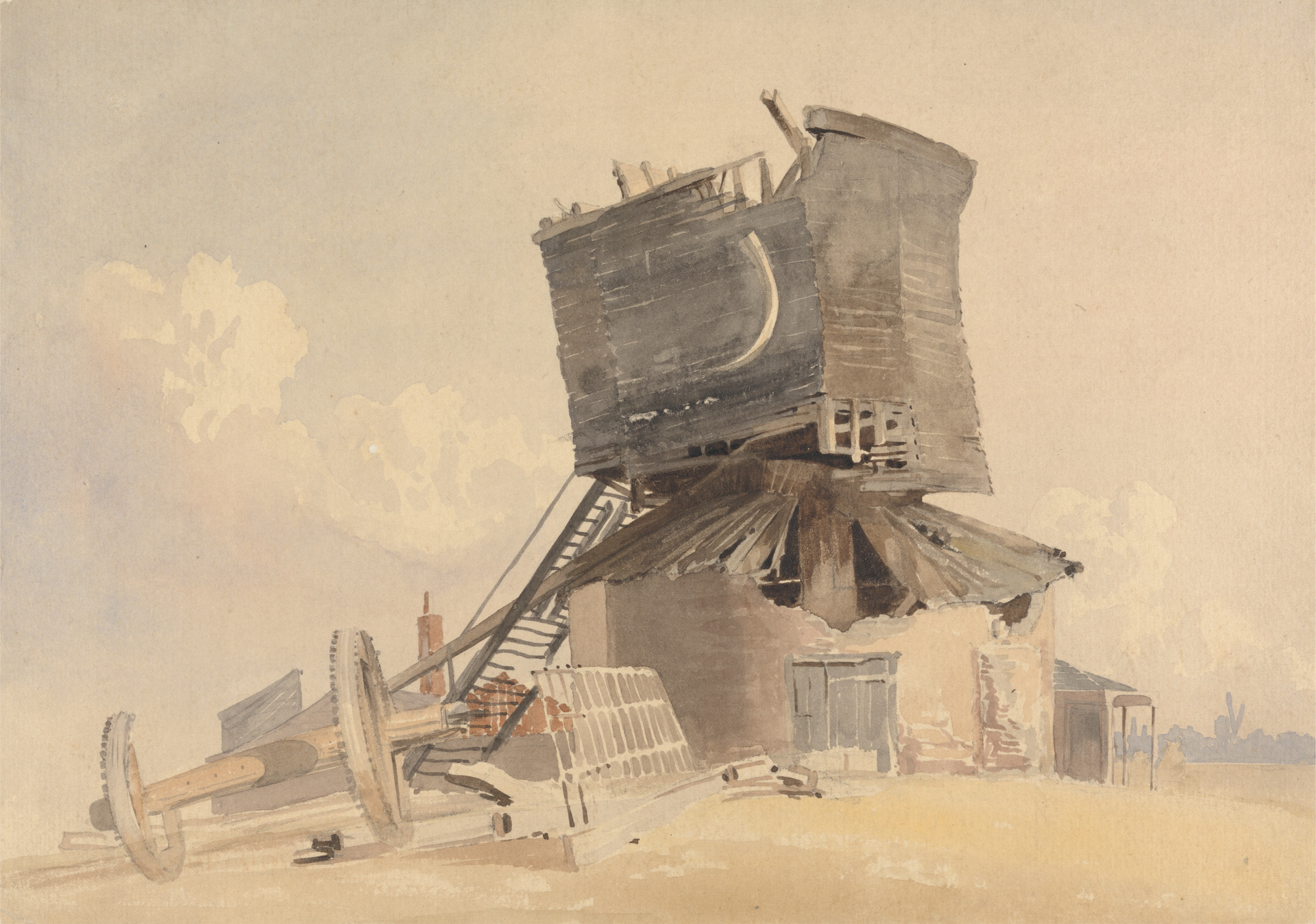
A Storm Damaged Windmill (undated), Yale Center for British Art

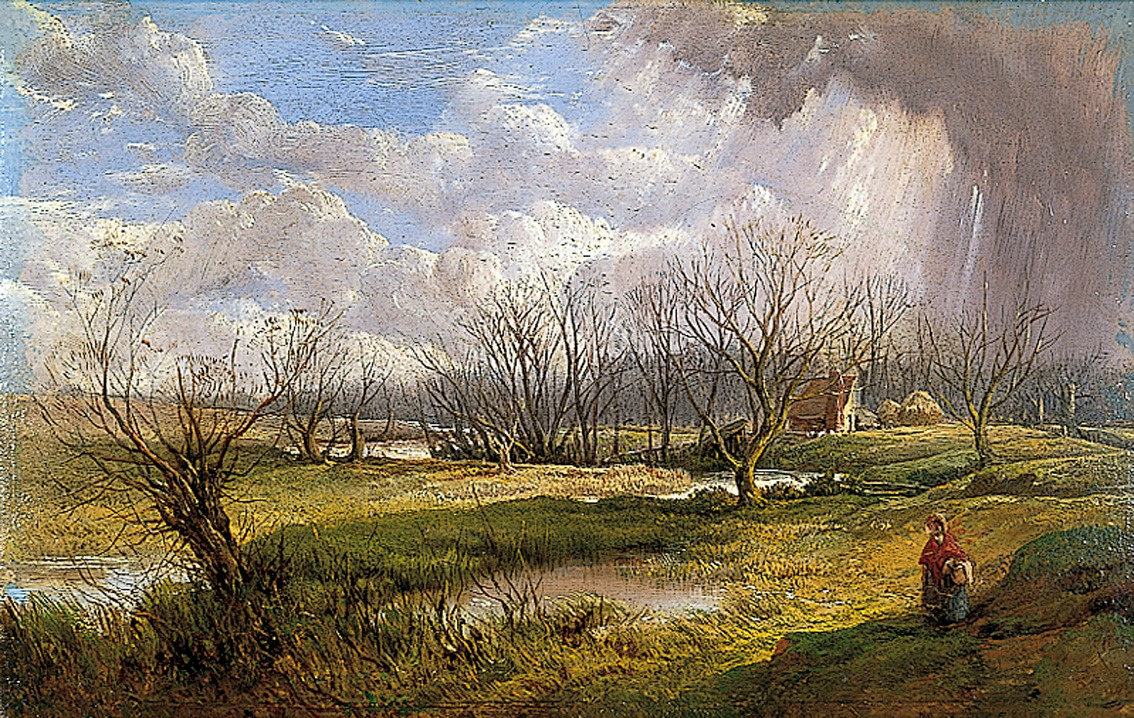
A Fine Day in February (Hellesdon) (undated), Norfolk Museums Collections

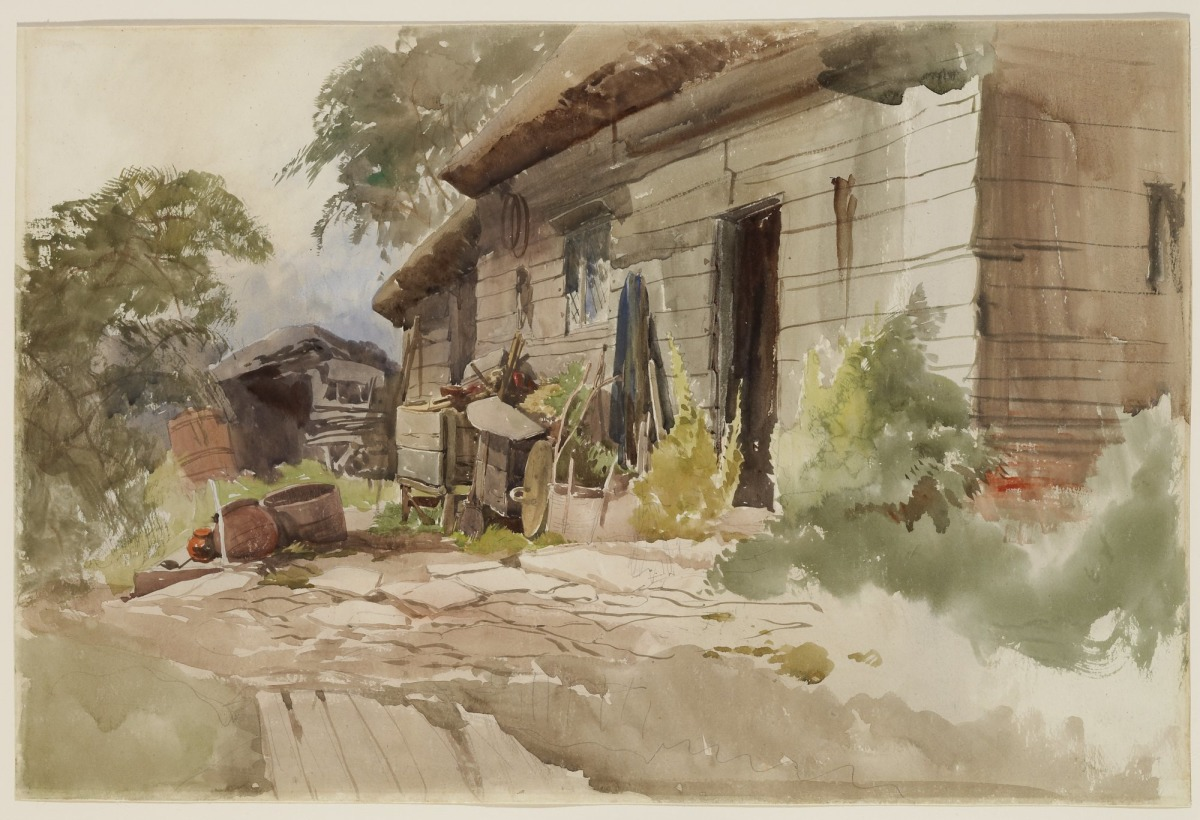
Landscape with a Cottage (c.1847), National Gallery of Canada

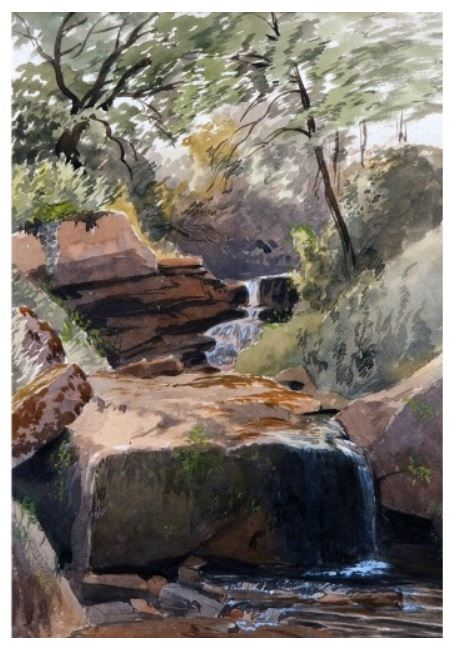
Wooded Landscape with Rocky Stream (undated)

== Sources ==
This article incorporates text from a publication now in the public domain: "Middleton, John". Dictionary of National Biography. London: Smith, Elder & Co. 1885–1900.

- Brall, Robert (2016). John Middleton and the Norwich School. CreateSpace Independent Publishing Platform; 3rd edition. ISBN 978-1-5329-0401-1.
- Brall, John (1901). "The precocious talent of John Middleton". The Connoisseur. Vol. 205, no. 825. London: National Magazine Company Limited. pp. 202–209.
- Cheetham, Francis William (1973). Henry Bright: 1810-1873; a catalogue of paintings and drawings in the collection of Norwich Castle Museum. Norwich: Norfolk Museums Service. OCLC 886965378.
- Clifford, Derek Plint (1965). Watercolours of the Norwich School. Cory, Adams & Mackay. OCLC 487520452.
- Cundall, Herbert Minton (1920). The Norwich School. London: Geoffrey Holme Ltd.
- Day, Harold (1969). The Norwich School of Painters. Eastbourne, UK: Eastbourne Fine Art. ISBN 978-0-902010-10-9.
- Denyer, Richard & Moore, Andrew, eds. (2003). A Period Eye: Photography Then & Now. Vol. 1. Norfolk Museums & Archeological Service. ISBN 978-0-903101-77-6.
- Dickes, William Frederick (1905). The Norwich school of painting: being a full account of the Norwich exhibitions, the lives of the painters, the lists of their respective exhibits and descriptions of the pictures. Norwich: Jarrold & Sons Ltd.
- Graves, Algernon (1895). A dictionary of artists who have exhibited works in the principal London exhibitions from 1760 to 1893. London: H. Graves.
- Hemingway, Andrew (1979). The Norwich School of Painters 1803-1833. Oxford: Phaidon. ISBN 978-0-7148-2001-9.
- Hemingway, Andrew (2017). Landscape between Ideology and the Aesthetic: Marxist Essays on British Art and Art Theory 1750-1850. Leiden: Brill. ISBN 978-1-60846-831-7.
- Jefferson, Richard (2013). A Victorian Gentleman's North Norfolk: WJJ Bolding and his place in early photography. Hindringham, Norfolk, UK: JJG Publishing. ISBN 978-1-899163-78-6.
- Norwich Photographic Society (1857). Catalogue of the first photographic exhibition to be held in Norwich: 17th November 1856 to 14th February 1857. Exhibition rooms, St.Andrews, Broad Street, Norwich. Norwich.
- Rajnai, Miklos; Stevens, Mary (1976). The Norwich Society of Artists, 1805-1833: a dictionary of contributors and their work. Norwich: Norfolk Museums Service for the Paul Mellon Centre for Studies in British Art. ISBN 978-0-903101-29-5.
- Moore, Andrew (1985). The Norwich School of Artists. London: HMSO. ISBN 978-0-11-701587-6.
- Searle, Geoffrey Russell (2015). Etchings of the Norwich School. Norwich: Lasse Press. ISBN 978-0-9568758-9-1.
- Taylor, Roger (2007). Impressed by Light: British Photographs from Paper Negatives, 1840-1860. New York: The Metropolitan Museum of Art. ISBN 978-1-58839-225-1.
- Walpole, Josephine (1997). Art and Artists of the Norwich School. Woodbridge: Antique Collectors' Club. ISBN 978-1-85149-261-9.
