= List of artworks by John Middleton =

This is an incomplete list of artworks by the British Norwich School artist John Middleton (9 January 1827 – 11 November 1856).

== Watercolours ==
- A Barn, Tunbridge Wells, Kent (1847) - private collection
- A Fine Day in February (Hellesdon, Norfolk) (exhibited at the Royal Academy and at the British Institution in 1852) – Norfolk Museums Collections
- A Limestone Quarry, Combe Martin, Devon – provenance not yet known
- An Avenue of Trees in Gunton Park – Fitzwilliam Museum
- A Path through a Wooded Landscape – Fitzwilliam Museum
- A Stream in Arran (exhibited at the Royal Academy in 1854)
- A Stream near Clovelly, North Devon
- A Study in March on the Norfolk Coast (exhibited at the Royal Academy in 1852)
- A Farm Building
- A Tributary of the Lynn (exhibited at the British Institution in 1853)
- An Old Cottage at Tunbridge Wells, Kent (?)
- Autumn (exhibited at the Royal Academy in 1847) – location unknown
- Avenue of Limes at Hatfield (exhibited at the Royal Academy in 1849)
- Blofield
- Bulls in a Landscape (?) – Norfolk Museums Collections
- Cantley Beck near Ketteringham (1848) – Norfolk Museums Collections
- Clearing the Wood — Early Spring (exhibited at the Royal Academy in 1850) https://archive.org/stream/norwichschoolofp00dick/norwichschoolofp00dick_djvu.txt
- Clearing with a lumber mill (1847?) Metropolitan Museum of Art
- Clovelly, on the Coast of Devonshire (exhibited at the Royal Academy in 1851) https://archive.org/stream/norwichschoolofp00dick/norwichschoolofp00dick_djvu.txt
- Feeding the Fowl-possibly the Old Saw Mills, Gunton Park (?)
- Felled Timber — Early Spring (exhibited at the Royal Academy in 1853)
- Gensheraig. Isle of Arran (exhibited at the British Institution in 1854)
- Gunton Park, Norfolk (1847) – Norfolk Museums Collections
- In the Isle of Arran, looking over the Firth of Clyde (exhibited at the Royal Academy in 1854)
- Landscape (1847) – Norfolk Museums Collections
- Landscape with Pollards (?) – Norfolk Museums Collections
- Landscape with trees and farm buildings (undated) –Victoria and Albert Museum
- Looking down the Stream (exhibited at the Royal Academy in 1855)
- On the River at Thorpe (?)
- Road Scene (?) – Norfolk Museums Collections
- Sand Hills on the Norfolk Coast (exhibited at the British Institution in 1853)
- Scene in North Wales (exhibited at the British Institution in 1847)
- Scene near Tunbridge Wells, Kent (exhibited at the British Institution in 1848)
- Stepping Stones (?) – Norfolk Museums Collections
- Study of trees and rocks – Norfolk Museums Collections
- Summer — A Study from Nature (exhibited at the British Institution in 1852)
- Sunshine and Shade, Ivybridge, Devon (exhibited at the British Institution in 1855)
- The Beech Forest - Evening (exhibited at the Royal Academy in 1848)
- The Field-burn (exhibited at the Royal Academy in 1847)
- The Greenwood Glade (1850)
- The Avenue, Gunton Park, Norfolk (1848) – Norfolk Museums Collections
- The Greenwood Glade (exhibited at the British Institution in 1850)
- The Roadside Barn (exhibited at the British Institution in 1849)
- The Stream in June (exhibited at the Royal Academy in 1852)
- The Village Common (exhibited at the British Institution in 1849)
- The Woods in Autumn (exhibited at the British Institution in 1850 and 1854)
- Tonbridge Wells – Norfolk Museums Collections
- Trees by a stream (?)
- Trees on a Riverbank, Eaton, Norwich (1847). Watercolour over pencil, 32 x 47 cm. London, Sotheby's. Lot 112, 15/7/93.
- Tunbridge Wells (1847) – link to painting (auctioned by Dominic Winter Auctions (July 2018))
- View of Mousehold, Norfolk (?) – Norfolk Museums Collections
- Weybourne on the Norfolk Coast (exhibited at the British Institution in 1852)
- Woodland clearing (c. 1845)

== Oil paintings ==
- The Woods in Autumn, Gunton Park (1849) – Norfolk Museums Collections

== Etchings ==
- Composition – Norfolk Museums Collections
- Felled Timber at Barningham – Norfolk Museums Collections
- Hatfield – Norfolk Museums Collections
- Ivy Bridge, South Devon – Norfolk Museums Collections
- Landscape with felled timber, large tree in foreground – Fitzwilliam Museum
- Landscape with felled timber, with clouds in the sky and water to the right – Fitzwilliam Museum
- Nine Etchings (book) – Norfolk Museums Collections
- Road and Trees – Norfolk Museums Collections
- View at Gunton – Norfolk Museums Collections
- View near Cromer – Norfolk Museums Collections
- Weybourne - looking towards the Beeston Hills – Norfolk Museums Collections
