= Thomas Lound =

English landscape painter (1801–1861)

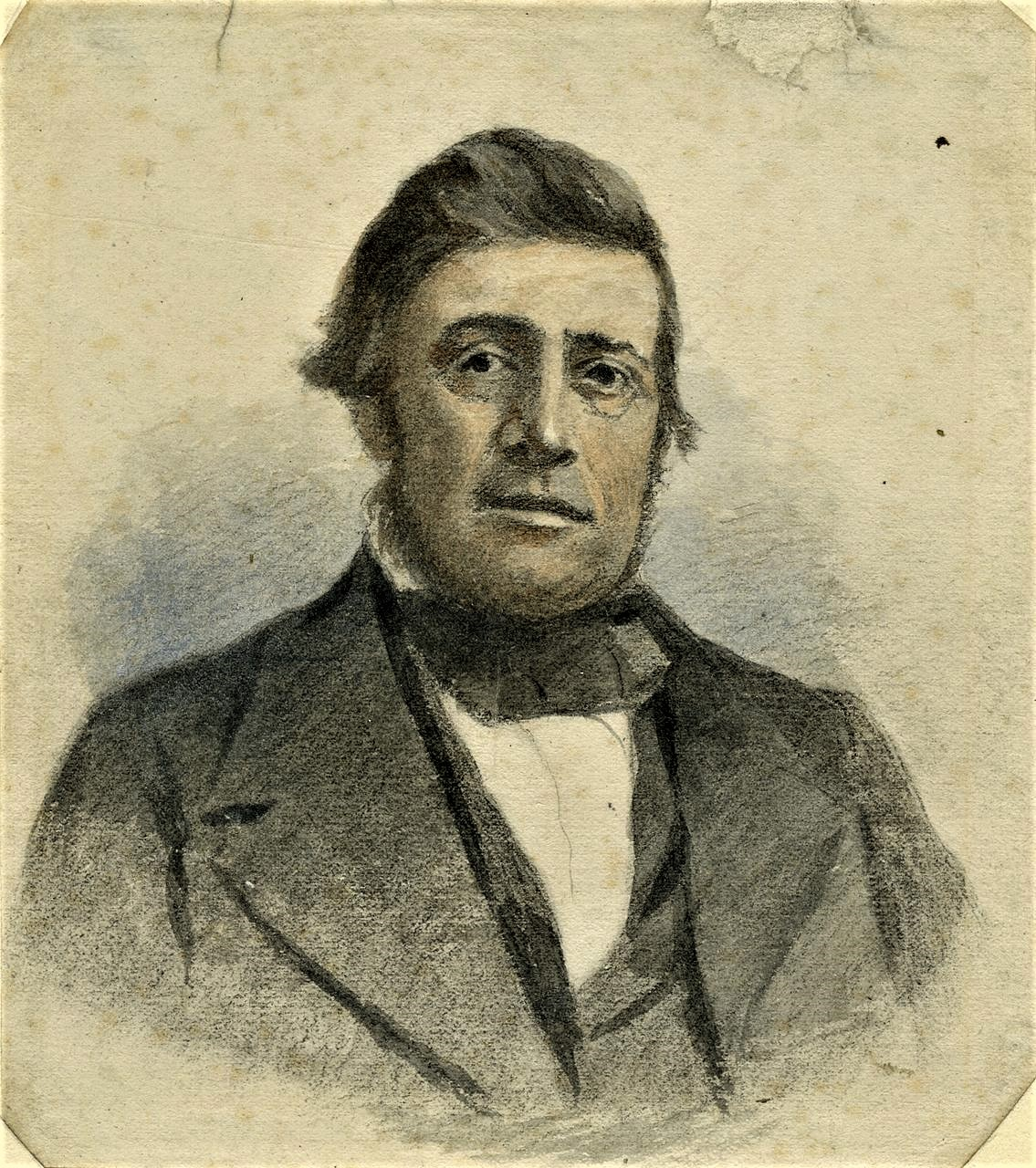
- Self-portrait (undated)
- Born: 13 July 1801; Beeston St Andrew, Norfolk, England
- Died: 18 January 1861 (aged 59); Norwich, England
- Known for: Landscape painting
- Movement: Norwich School of painters
- Spouse: Harriot Wetherill (m. 1821; died 1859)

Thomas Lound (13 July 1801 – 18 January 1861) was an amateur English painter and etcher of landscapes, who specialised in depictions of his home county of Norfolk. He was a member of the Norwich School of painters, and lived in the city of Norwich all his life.

Born into a wealthy brewing family, Lound was affluent enough to possess his own photographic equipment as well as to pursue his passion for art. He became an avid collector of works of art, and particularly admired (and collected) the paintings of the Norwich painter John Thirtle. Lound was popular amongst his contemporaries, and close friends with the Norwich artists Robert Leman, Henry Bright and John Middleton. Throughout his life he suffered from ill health, and he died suddenly of apoplexy at the age of 59, a year after the deaths of his wife and son.

Lound is considered by art historians to rank among the best of the watercolourists of the Norwich School. He was trained by John Sell Cotman, but his artistic style was more heavily influenced by the landscapist David Cox. Lound's etchings, never produced for public display, show the influence of drypoint technique of Edward Thomas Daniell. He was also a competent copyist with a talent for imitating the artistic style of other artists. His oil paintings contain both broad brush and fine brushwork; he exhibited 12 works with the Norwich Society of Artists from 1820 to 1833, and showed works in London at the British Institution and the Royal Academy of Arts.

== Life ==
Parish records show that Thomas Lound was born on 13 July 1801, the son of Thomas and Mary Lound, and was christened by his parents in the parish church of Beeston St Andrew, Norfolk on 9 August 1801. Little is known of his childhood.

Lound married Harriot Wetherill on Christmas Day 1821, and there were several children. An amateur artist, he was involved with his family's brewing business in Norwich, Charles Tompson & Sons, which was the source of his wealth. He was later employed as an agent for the insurance company County Fire and Provident Life Office. He lived in comfort, residing throughout his adult life on King Street, in the centre of Norwich.

Popular amongst his peers, Lound was a great friend of the amateur artist Robert Leman. Together with Leman, the artists Henry Bright and John Middleton and Lound were all close friends. Along with Leman and David Hodgson, Lound was a member of the Norwich Amateur Club; he and Hodgson helped to revitalise the Norwich Artists' Conversaziones. (Note: The Artists' Conversaziones was inaugurated in 1829 and established by John Sell Cotman and John Berney Crome in 1830.. Membership was by subscription. The evening meetings, held regularly in the city's Norfolk Hotel, were aimed at promoting the fine arts in Norwich and included the inspection and discussion of works by artists present that evening. No further meetings were held after the demise of the Norwich Society of Artists in 1833.) He used his yacht Kathleen, which was adorned with a number of oil paintings, as a venue for entertaining his friends. He is known to have travelled to Wales with Leman in 1851, and surviving sketchbooks show that he went to Wales and Yorkshire on sketching tours in 1845, 1853 and 1854.

Lound was an avid collector of other artists' works, in particular those painted by the Norwich painter John Thirtle. A great admirer of Thirtle, Lound used his wealth to acquire 75 of the artist's paintings.

A keen photographer, Lound was wealthy enough to possess his own photographic equipment, and was a committee member of the Norwich Photographic Society. Little of his work as a photographer appears to have survived. He exhibited waxed-paper views of Ely Cathedral, Norwich fish market, and the ruins of Bromholm Priory.

Lound's wife Harriot died in 1859, and his son Henry Edwin Lound also predeceased him, dying in 1860. Lound, who suffered from ill health all his life, died suddenly of apoplexy on 18 January 1861 whilst at his Norwich house in King Street. His will was proved in February that year, with his two daughters Ellen and Harriot acting as executors. His large art collection, which was sold the following month, included 39 sketches, 215 watercolours, 46 oil paintings, and 11 etchings. Almost all the volumes from his library sold at auction after his death were art books.

== Artistic life ==
=== Training ===
Lound was one of a group of talented amateurs who learnt from the previous two generations of Norwich School artists. He was a pupil of the artist John Sell Cotman, although his influence was not as great as that of the English landscape painter David Cox. Lound became an accomplished draughtsman whose charcoal and chalk drawings resemble those by Joseph Stannard.

=== Watercolours ===
Lound was a prolific watercolourist despite working for the family business throughout his working life. He specialised in producing views of his native county of Norfolk. The art historian Josephine Walpole considers Lound as ranking amongst Leman, Bright, Middleton, John Sell Cotman and his sons, and Thirtle as the best of the Norwich School watercolourists, but also notes that Lound lacked the skill and consistent quality displayed by his amateur friends. She describes the many small watercolours he produced as spontaneous, charming, and full of vitality.

Writing in the 1980s, the art historian Andrew Moore has praised View of Norwich (Mill in Foreground) as "the most perfect example of Lound's original compositions". Lound with Leman helped to form the Norfolk and Norwich Art Union, and was a while its president. The art historian Derek Clifford describes his drawings as having "been done before by somebody else; so that every Lound is, as it were, a Thirtle or a Cotman or a Bright or a Cox". Lound's works have at times been confused with those of Cotman, Crome, and Thirtle. The Norwich Mercury praised his powers as an amateur artist. According to Clifford, the "sometimes rather good" material contained in Lound's sketchbooks provides "a glimpse of the man himself".

Lound exhibited twelve works with the Norwich Society of Artists from 1820 to 1833, first exhibiting his painting St Benet's Abbey. He exhibited in London from 1845 to 1859, showing pictures at the British Institution and the Royal Academy of Arts.

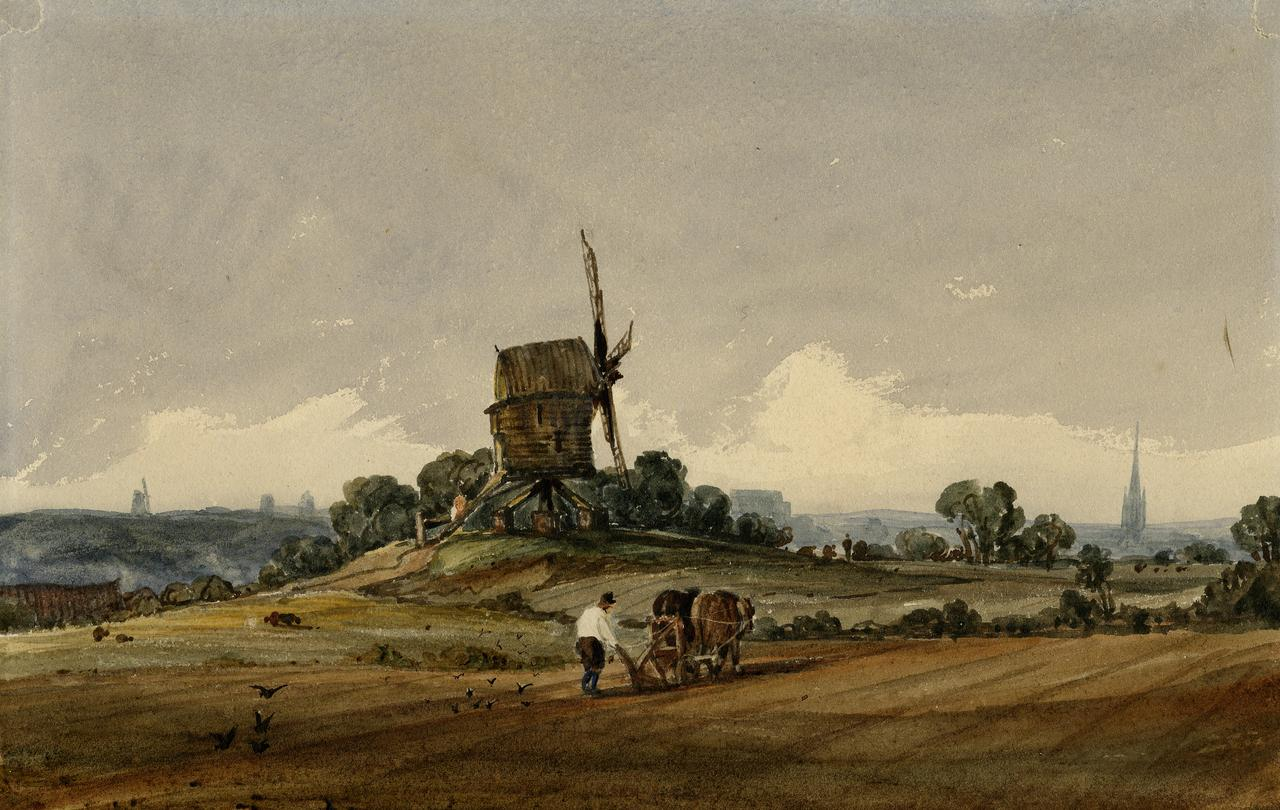
View of Norwich (undated), Norfolk Museums Collections

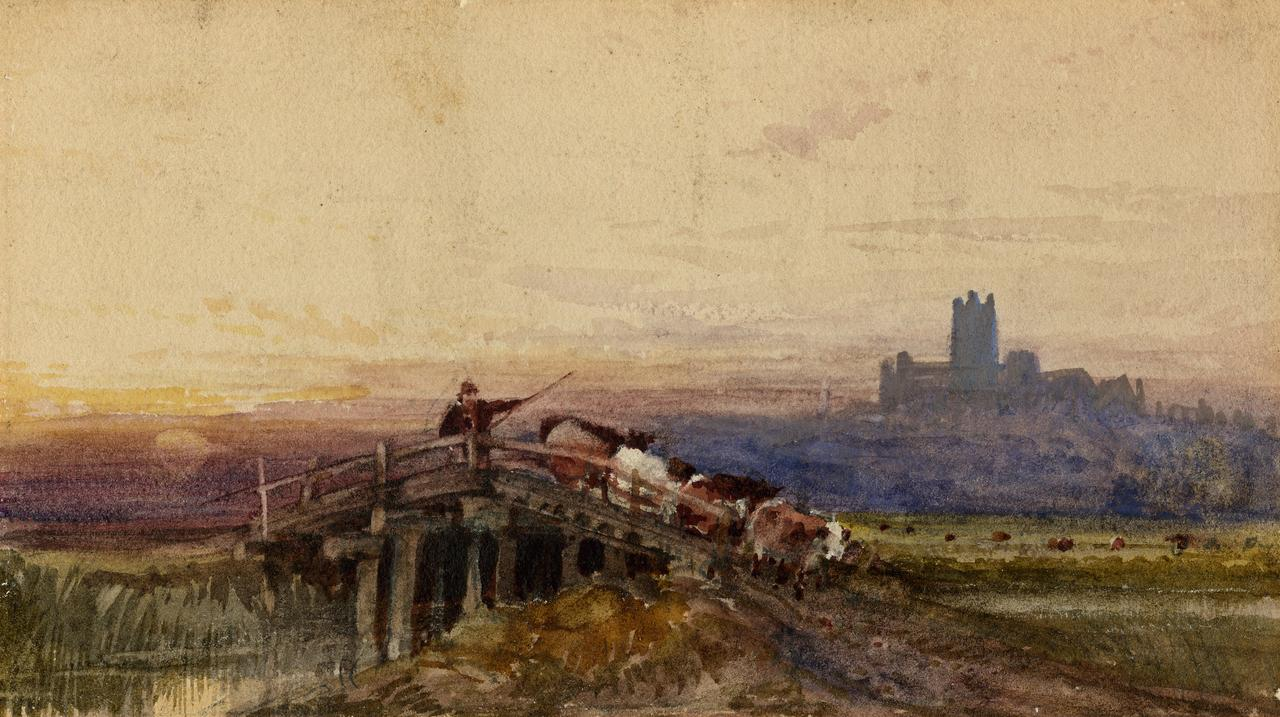
Ely Cathedral (undated), Norfolk Museums Collections

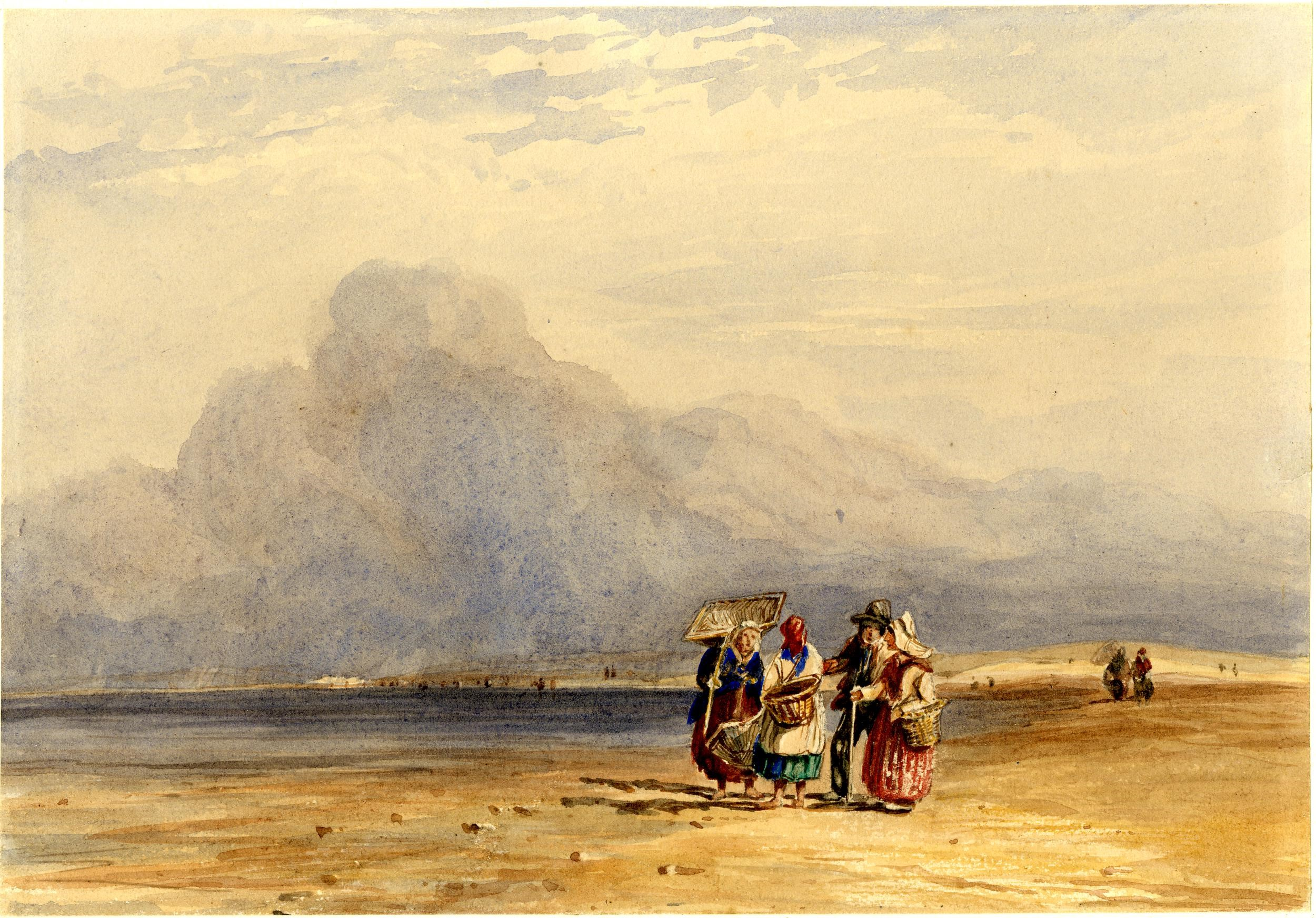
Shrimpers (after David Cox, undated), British Museum

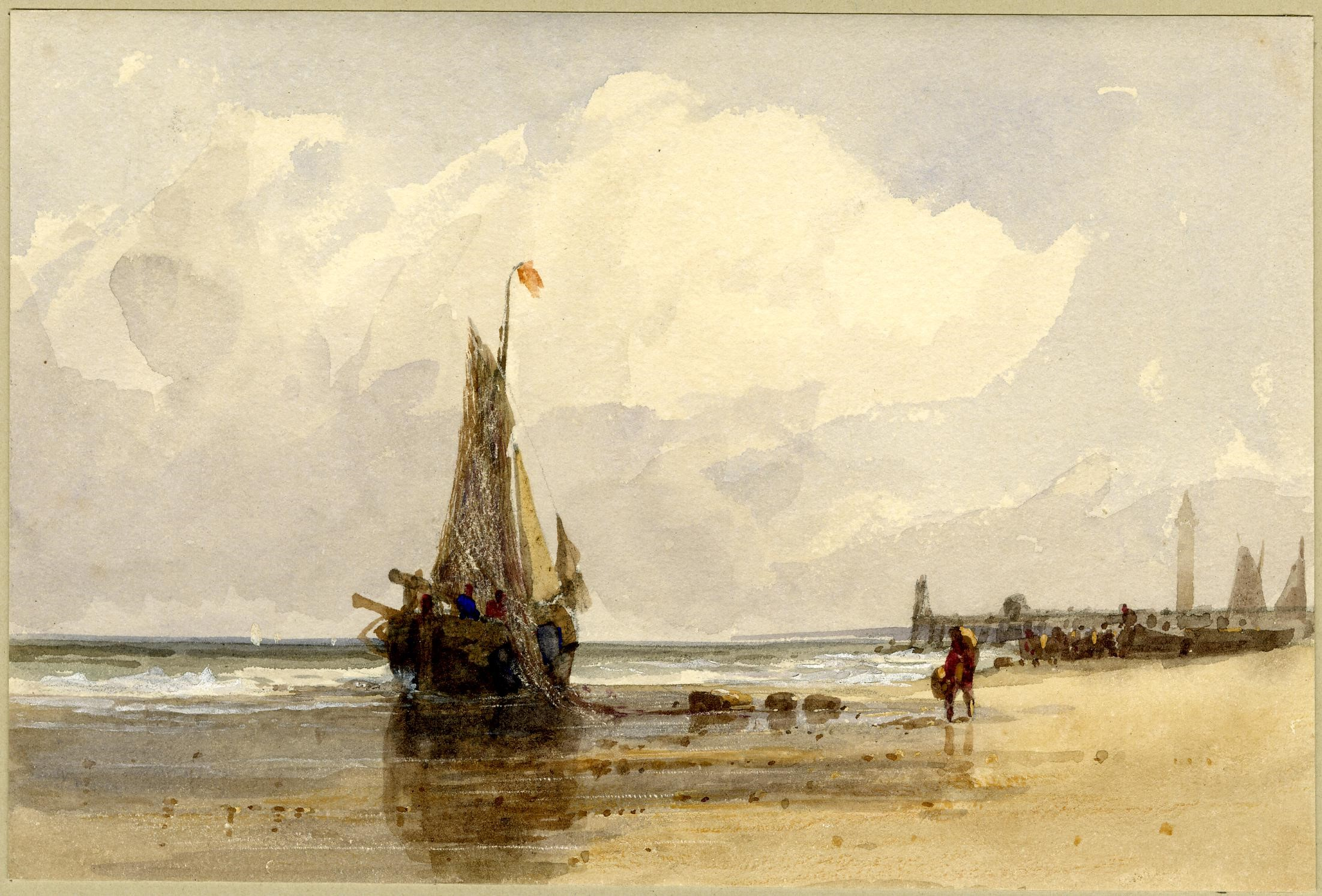
Yarmouth Beach (undated), British Museum

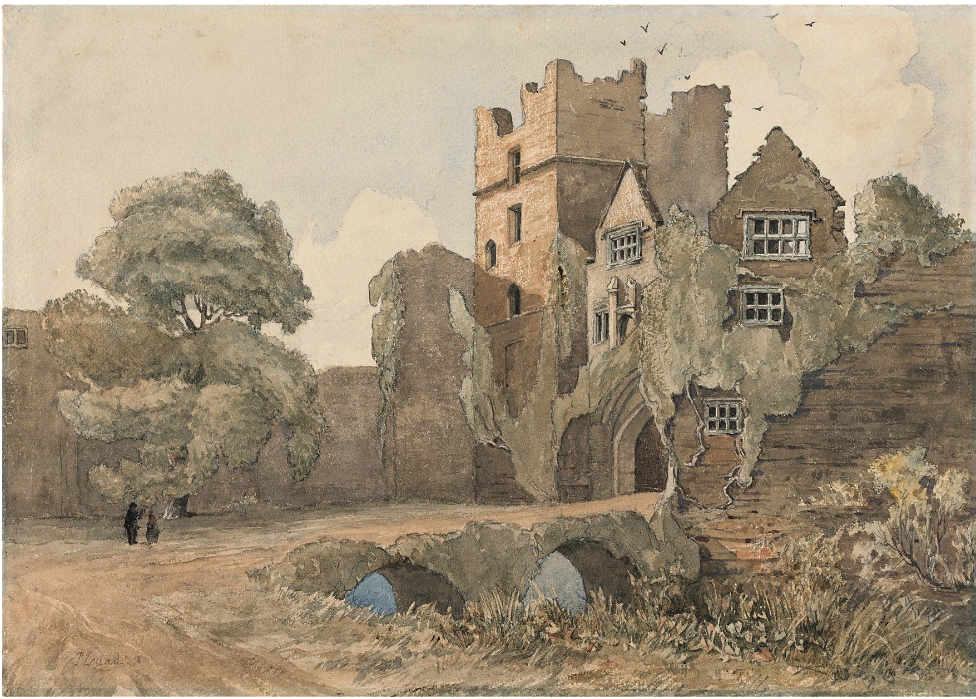
The Keep and Gate, Ludlow Castle, Shropshire (undated, watercolour, gouache and graphite), Yale Center for British Art

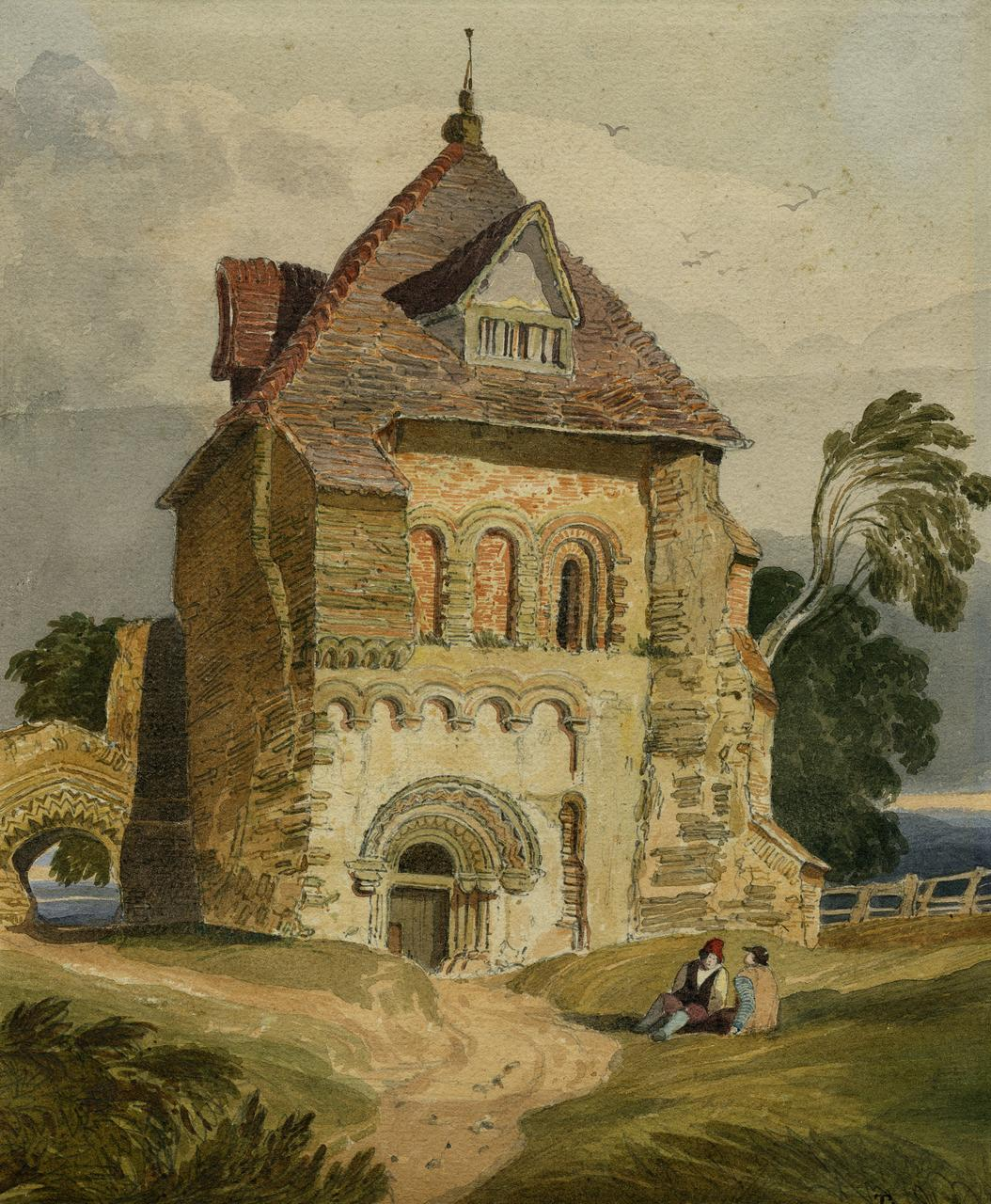
Near Durham (undated), Norfolk Museums Collections

=== Etchings ===
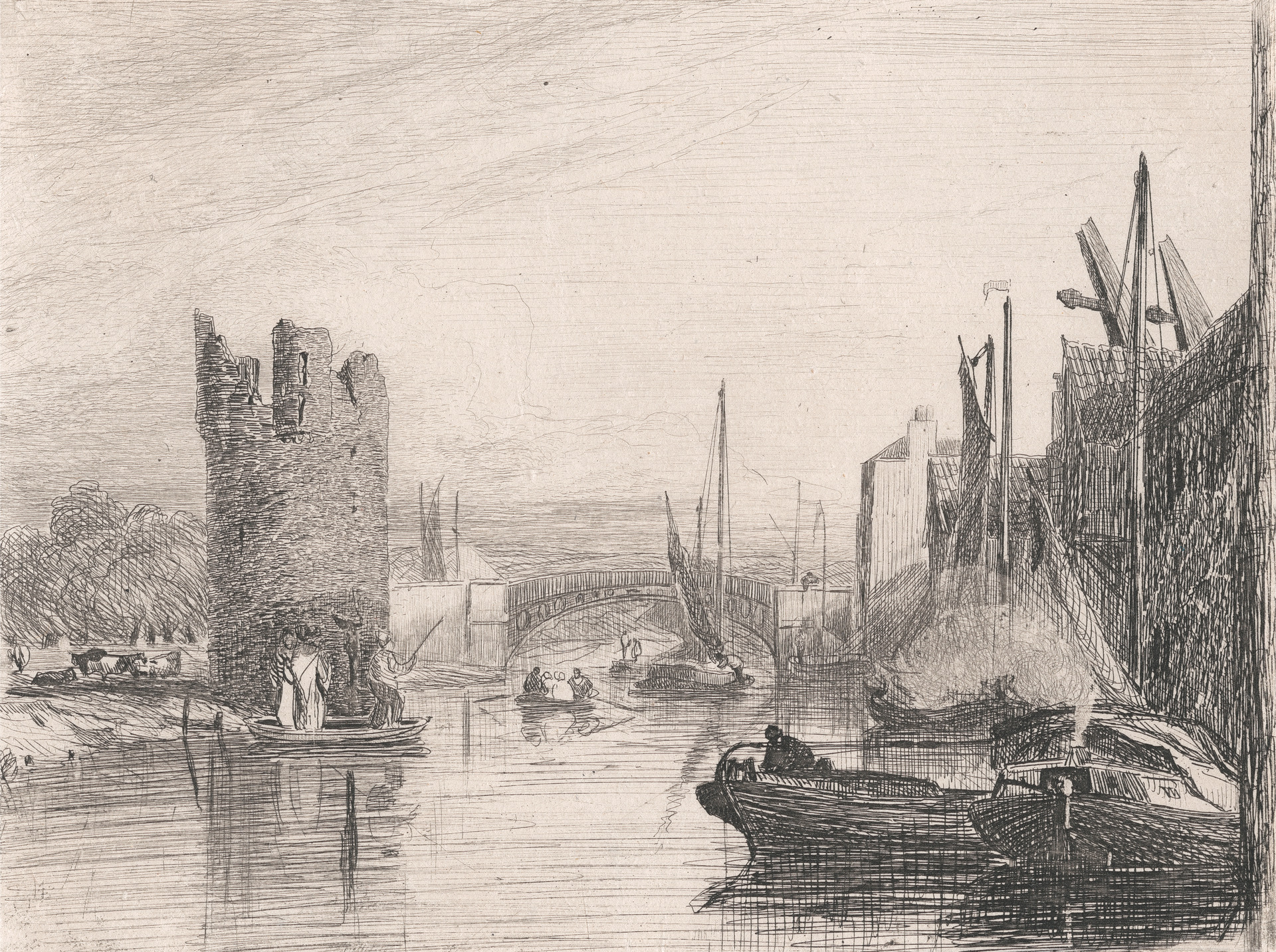
Devil's Tower Looking towards Carrow Bridge from Norwich (c. 1832, after Thirtle), Yale Center for British Art

Lound was a competent copyist, reproducing works such as Cotman's St. Martin's Gate, Norwich and his Yarmouth Jetty, as well as paintings by John Crome, Robert Dixon, Cox and Joseph Stannard. He had a talent for imitating the artistic style of other artists; the engraving of Thirtle's Devil's Tower—looking towards Carrow Bridge by Lound illustrates his ability as an etcher by the way he conveys the balance of tints and shades in Thirtle's original composition.

Lound's 20 known etchings show the influence of drypoint technique of Edward Thomas Daniell, whose own etchings have a dark, rich quality. Along with Henry Ninham, Lound began to adopt Daniell's technique after 1831. His etchings—and those of Ninham and Miles Edmund Cotman—are very small in comparison with those produced by contemporaries such as Cotman, Daniell and Stannard. They were not produced for public display, but were intended to be viewed closely by Lound's friends. After the mid-1830s Lound seems not to have etched any more, although he continued to paint and draw for another 30 years.

=== Oils ===
Lound was influenced by Cotman in his style of oil painting. His oils contain both broad brush and fine brushwork, but according to Walpole, his oil paintings are less assured than his watercolours.

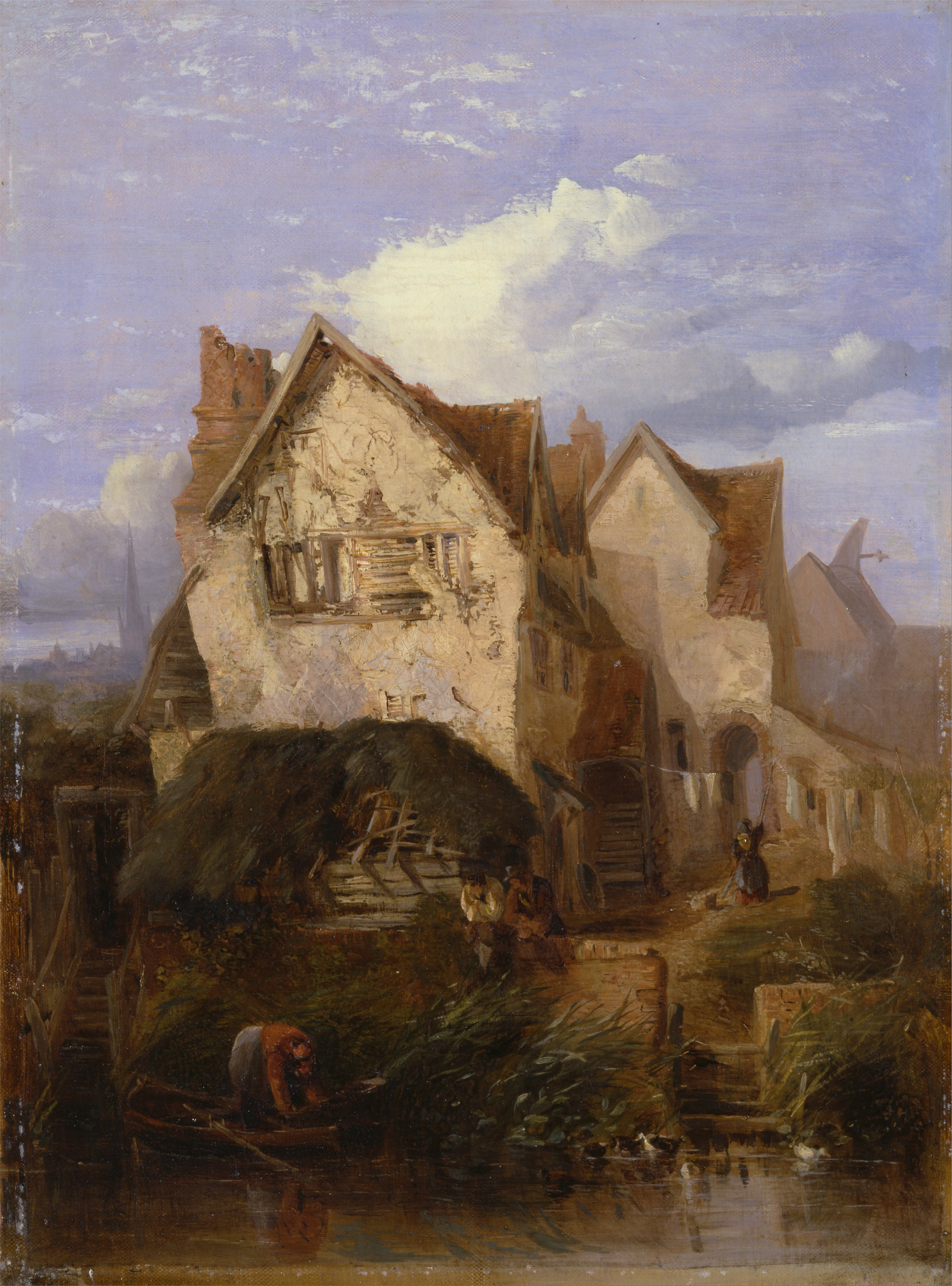
A View near Norwich (c. 1850), Yale Center for British Art

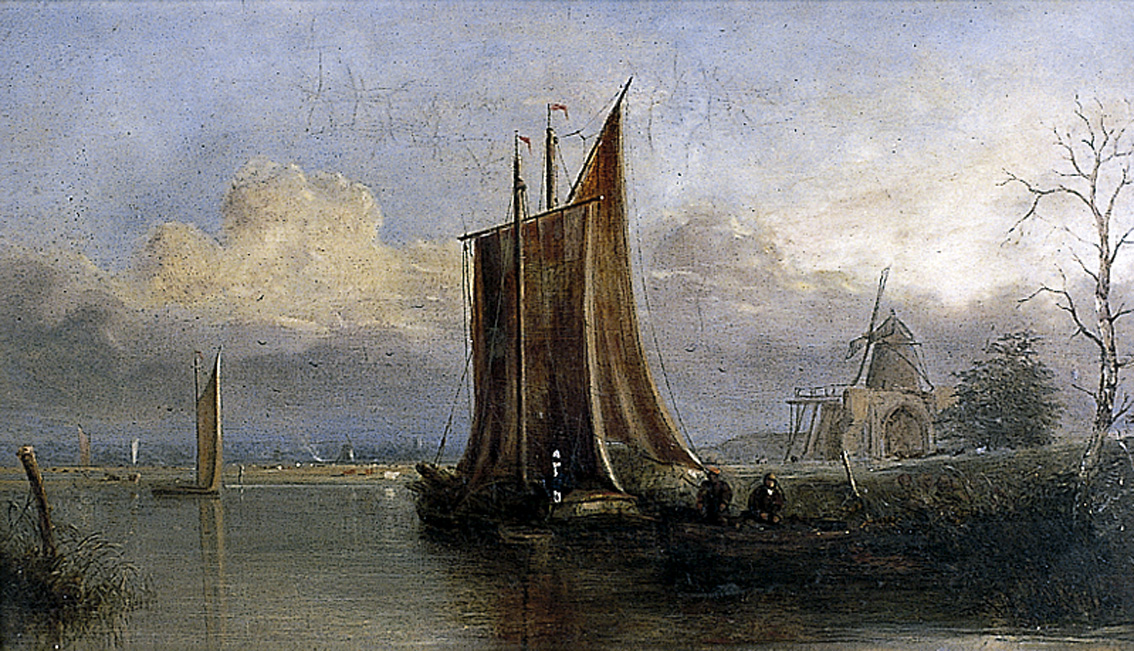
St Benet's Abbey, Norfolk (undated), Norfolk Museums Collections

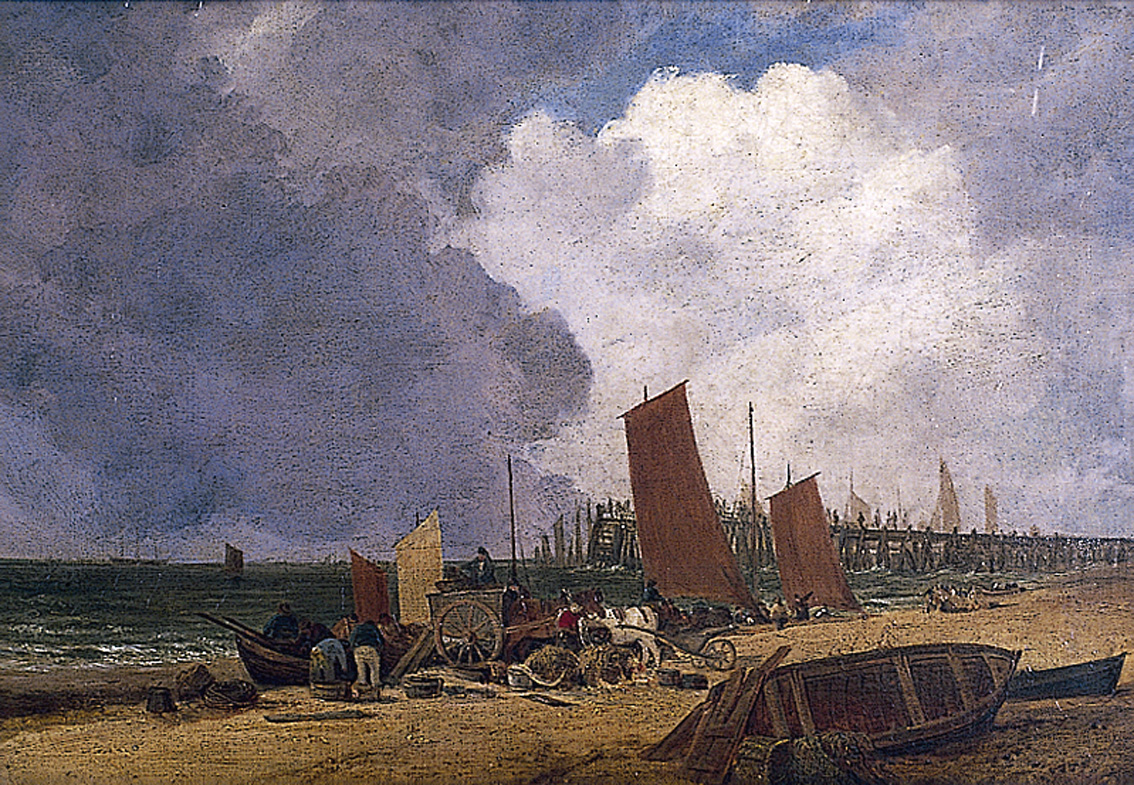
Yarmouth Beach and Jetty, after John Crome (undated), Norfolk Museums Collections

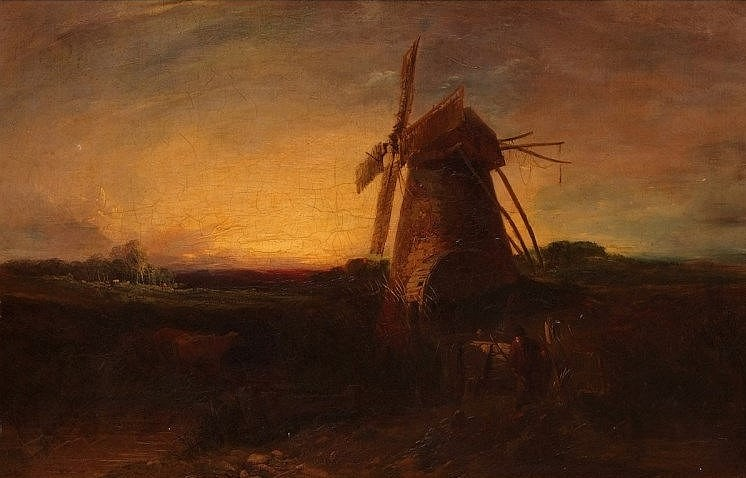
Marsh Mill near Reedham, Evening (undated)

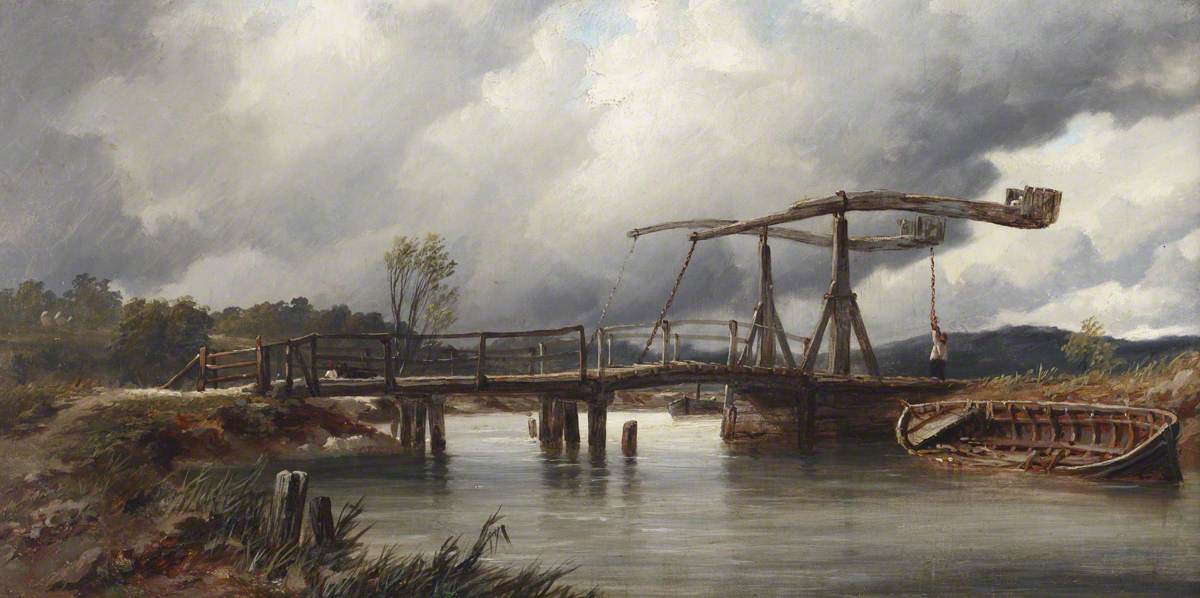
A Swing Bridge on the River Ouse (undated), National Trust

== Bibliography ==
- Clifford, Derek Plint (1965). Watercolours of the Norwich School. London: Cory, Adams & Mackay. OCLC 1624701.
- Cust, Lionel Henry (1893). "Lound, Thomas". Dictionary of National Biography. London: Smith, Elder & Co.
- Day, Harold (1969). The Norwich School of Painters. Eastbourne, UK: Eastbourne Fine Art. ISBN 978-0-902010-10-9.
- Dickes, William Frederick (1905). The Norwich School of Painting: being a full account of the Norwich exhibitions, the lives of the painters, the lists of their respective exhibits and descriptions of the pictures. Norwich: Jarrold & Sons Ltd. OCLC 192940599.
- Hemingway, Andrew (1979). The Norwich School of Painters 1803–1833. Oxford: Phaidon. ISBN 978-0-7148-2001-9.
- Moore, Andrew (1985). The Norwich School of Artists. London: HMSO. ISBN 978-0-11-701587-6.
- Rajnai, Miklos; Stevens, Mary (1976). The Norwich Society of Artists, 1805–1833: a dictionary of contributors and their work. Norwich: Norfolk Museums Service for the Paul Mellon Centre for Studies in British Art. ISBN 978-0-903101-29-5.
- Searle, Geoffrey R. (2015). Etchings of the Norwich School. Norwich: Lasse Press. ISBN 978-0-95687-589-1.
- Taylor, Roger; Schaaf, John (2007). Impressed by Light: British Photographs from Paper Negatives, 1840-1860. New York: Metropolitan Museum of Art. ISBN 978-1-58839-225-1.
- Walpole, Josephine (1997). Art and Artists of the Norwich School. Woodbridge, UK: Antique Collectors' Club. ISBN 978-1-85149-261-9.
