= Robert Leman =

English painter (1799–1869)

Robert Orgill Leman
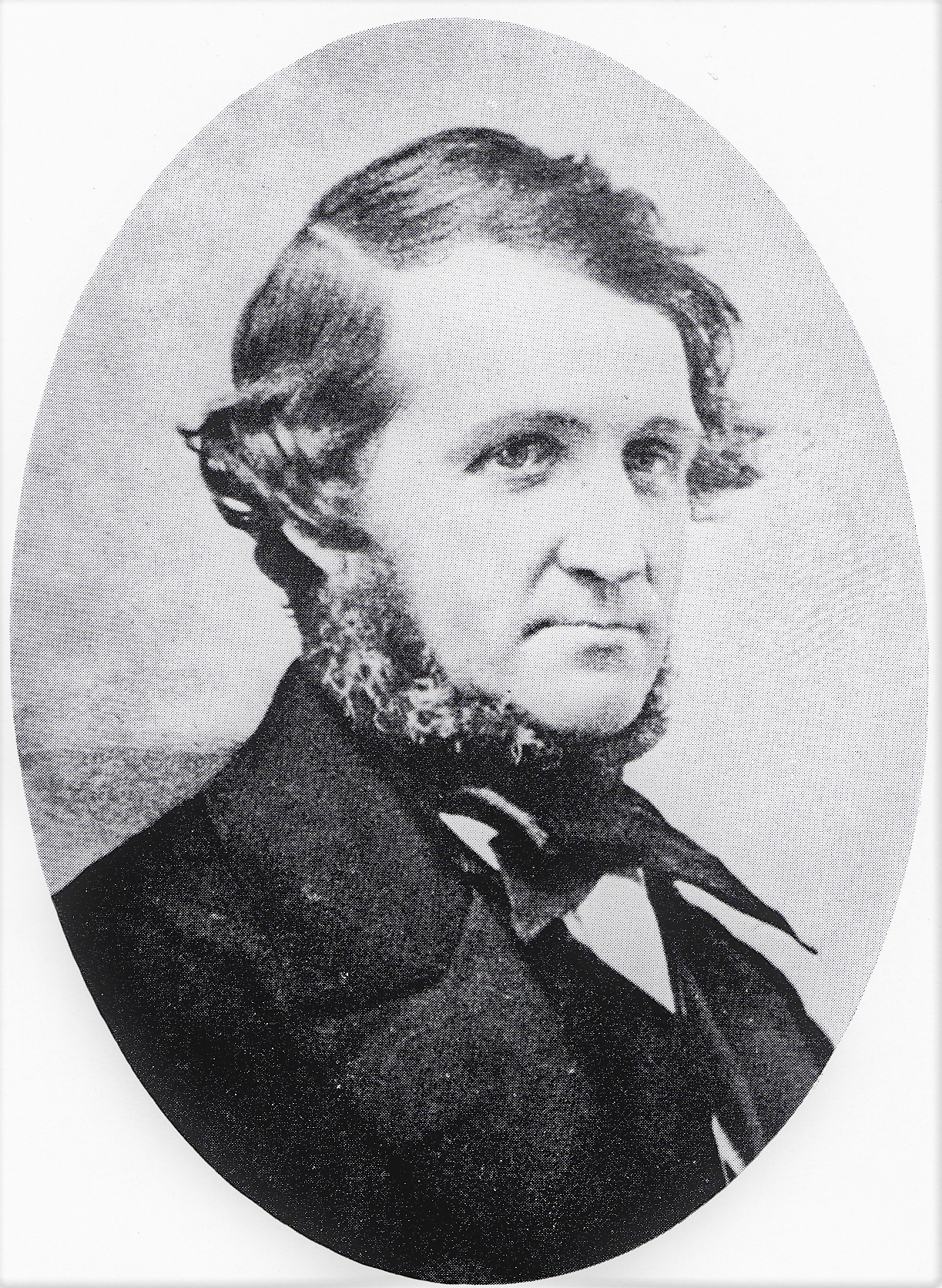
- an undated early photograph of Robert Leman
- Born: 12 April 1799; Brampton, Suffolk
- Died: 1869; Brampton
- Education: John Sell Cotman
- Known for: Landscape painting
- Movement: Norwich School of painters

Robert Orgill Leman (1799–1869) was an English painter of landscapes and a member of the Norwich School of painters.

== Life ==
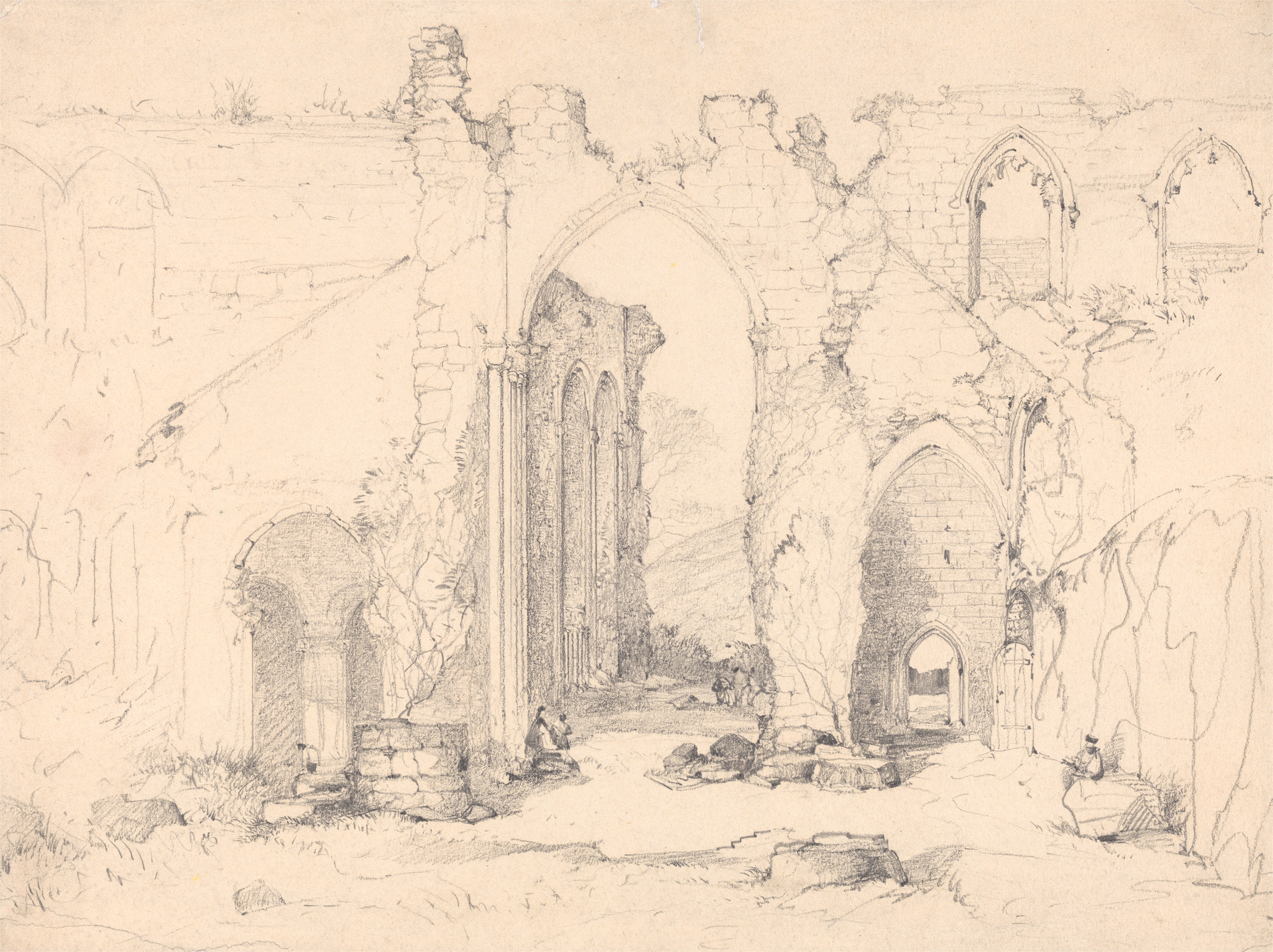
Visitors at a Ruined Abbey (undated), Yale Center for British Art

Robert Orgill Leman was born on 12 April 1799 as Robert Orgill, the son of Naunton Thomas Orgill and his wife Henrietta Jane Anderson, and was baptised on the same day. His father, the Reverend Naunton Thomas Orgill, succeeded to the estates of the Leman family and was obliged to add the family name to Leman as a result. Studying under John Sell Cotman, he became a talented amateur landscape painter and exhibited his works in Norwich with the Norwich Society of Artists. Leman differed from many of his artistic friends in the Society by not having to sell his works for a living: he painted and etched drawings for his own interest. He died in 1869 and was buried at Brampton, the village in Suffolk where he was born.

== Bibliography ==
- Clifford, Derek Plint (1965). Watercolours of the Norwich School. Cory, Adams & Mackay.
- Walpole, Josephine (1997). Art and Artists of the Norwich School. Woodbridge: Antique Collectors' Club. ISBN 1-85149-261-5.
