= Ruth Barker =

- Born: Ruth Platt; March 28, 1925; Norwich, Norfolk
- Died: August 31, 2009 (aged 84); Norwich
- Education: University of Reading
- Occupations: Artist, activist, teacher
- Employer: Norwich Castle

Ruth Barker (née Platt; 28 March 1925 – 31 August 2009) was a British artist, activist, and teacher, who was a leading figure in the Norwich Twenty Group from the late 1940s, and a co-founder of the Norfolk Contemporary Art Society.

== Life ==
Ruth Platt was born in 1925 in Norwich, and raised in a Quaker family. She studied fine art at the University of Reading, where she became friends with Mary Slatford (later Newcomb). They both subsequently settled in Norfolk. In 1949, Ruth married the sculptor Edward Barker, with whom she had two daughters.

Barker became assistant keeper of art at Norwich Castle museum and art gallery, and was a co-founder of the Norfolk Contemporary Art Society (NCAS). She worked to ensure that modern art was championed at the Castle, and chaired a sub-committee for NCAS focused on developing a programme of events, including lectures on painting, sculpture, and architecture, film showings, building visits, and guided exhibition visits.

After leaving her role as assistant keeper at the Castle, Barker held teaching positions at the Norwich School of Art and Design, and the Hewett School, where she remained until her retirement in 1985.

The Barkers lived for many years at Newton Flotman, where during the 1960s they established a summer school, inspired by Suffolk painter Cedric Morris' East Anglian School of Painting and Drawing.

Following the death of Edward Barker in 1984, she moved to Norwich, becoming well-known locally for selling the CND journal Sanity, and promoting ecological causes. A lifelong pacifist, Barker protested at many military sites, including Greenham Common.

A few weeks before her death, Barker spoke at a memorial exhibition at Norwich Castle for her friend and fellow Norfolk artist Mary Newcomb.

Ruth Platt died in Norwich on 31 August 2009. An obituary by Ian Collins was published in The Guardian.
