= Rosary Cemetery, Norwich =

Non-denominational burial ground in Norwich, England

Coordinates: 52.6276°N 1.3154°E

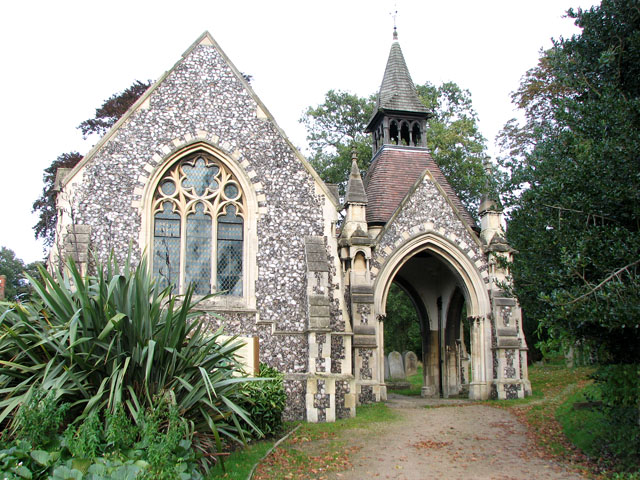
Rosary Cemetery chapel, designed by Edward Boardman.

Rosary Cemetery was the first non-denominational burial ground in the United Kingdom. Its entrance lies on Rosary Road in Norwich, Norfolk. It is a haven for wildlife and won a Community Biodiversity Award in 2008.

== History ==
The cemetery was established in 1819 by Thomas Drummond, a non-conformist minister. The land was formerly in use as a market garden, and presents a broad green open space between the housing areas to the south and the playing fields of the Telegraph Lane schools to the north. The 13 acres (53,000 m^{2}) of the cemetery came under the control of the Norwich Corporation in 1954 and it is estimated that about 18,500 people have been buried there since 1821. It was announced in January 2010 that the cemetery had been granted Grade II* listed status.

== Notable burials ==
Among them are train driver John Prior and fireman James Light, killed in the 1874 Thorpe rail accident. The surgeon Emanuel Cooper (1802–1878) is also buried in the cemetery in a large mausoleum. His daughter Ada married the novelist John Galsworthy.

The cemetery contains war graves of 31 Commonwealth service personnel, 19 from World War I and 12 from World War II.

Painters Leslie Davenport (1905–1973) (one of the Norwich Twenty Group), James Stark, John Thirtle and John Berney Ladbrooke are also buried here.

Jeremiah Colman and other members of the Colman family, known for manufacturing mustard, are buried here.

== Gallery ==
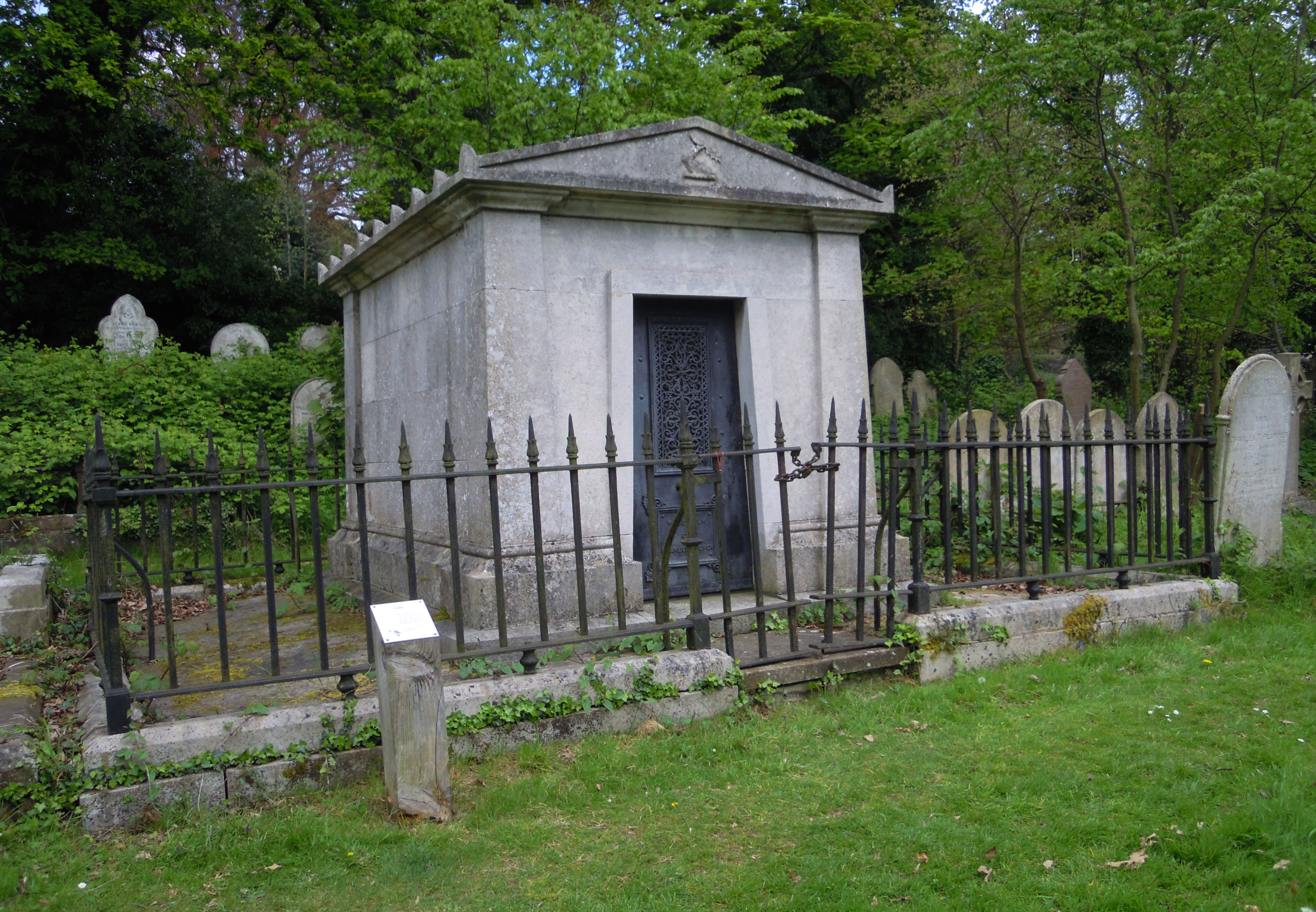
The mausoleum of surgeon Emanuel Cooper

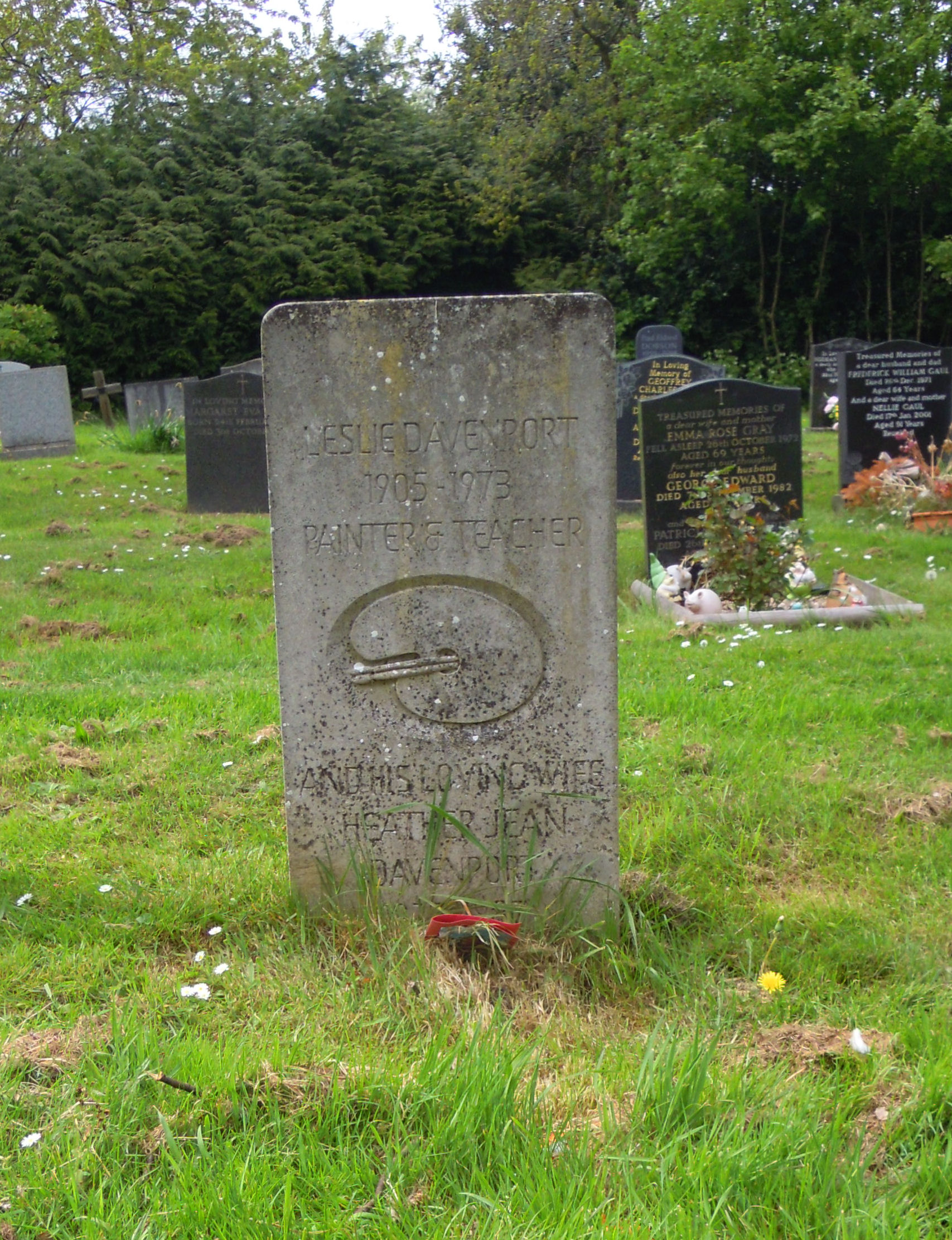
The grave of artist Leslie Davenport

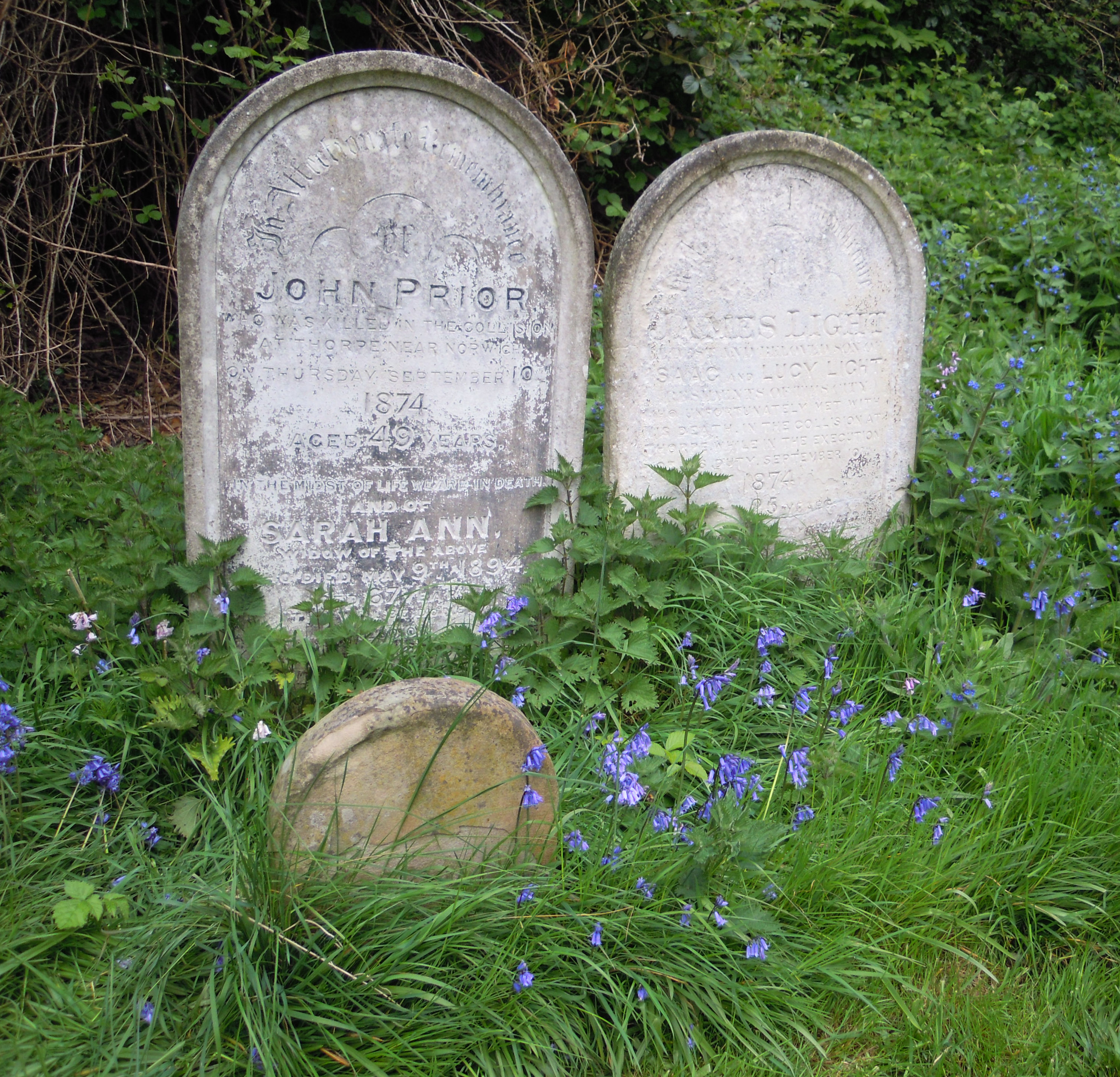
The graves of John Prior and James Light

== See also ==
- Gildencroft Quaker Cemetery, Norwich
