= John Berney Ladbrooke =

English painter

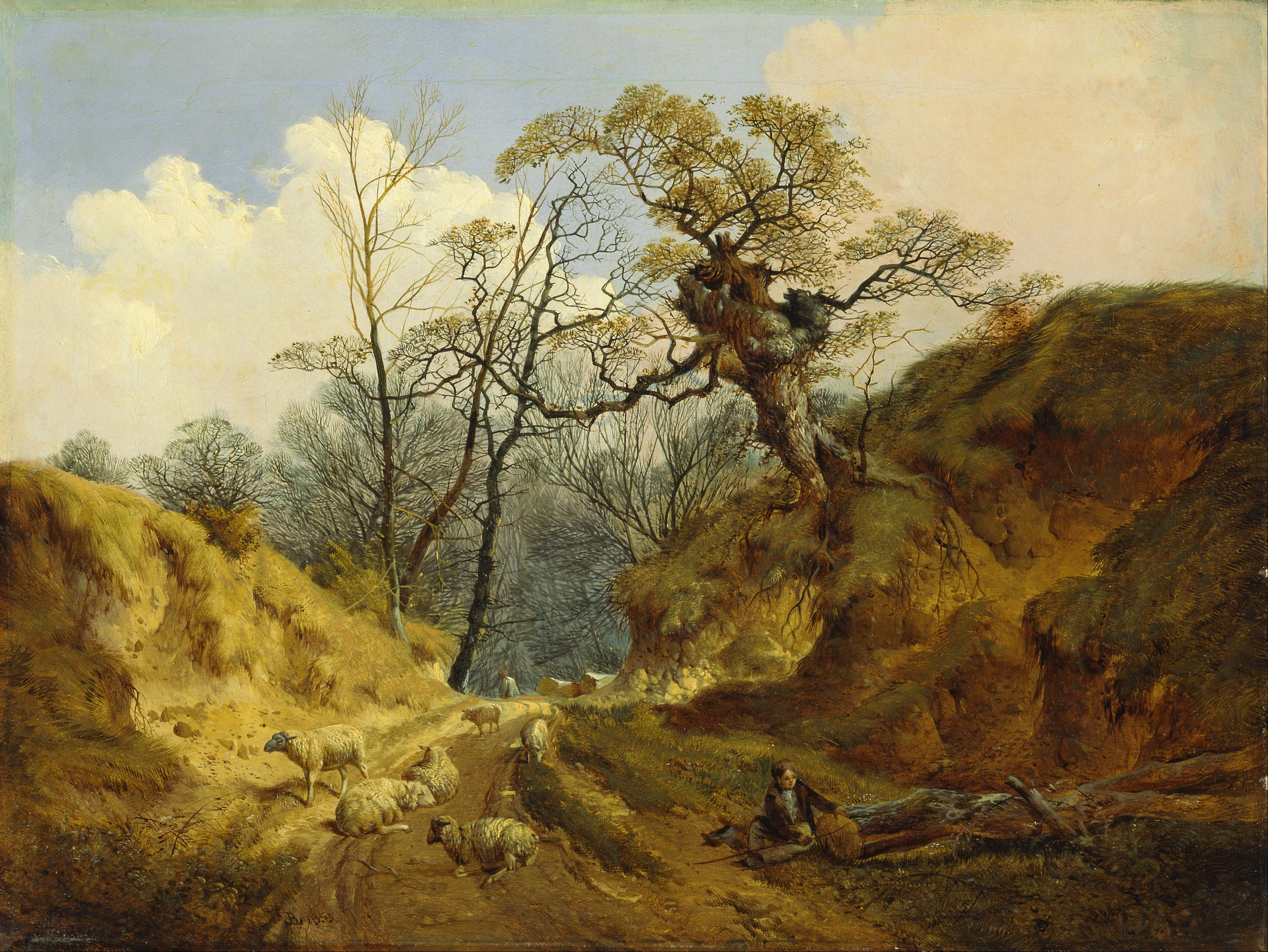
- Crown Point, Whitlingham, near Norwich (1855), Yale Center for British Art
- Born: 31 October 1803; Norfolk, UK
- Died: 1 July 1879 (aged 75); Norwich, Norfolk, UK
- Occupation: Painter
- Known for: Norwich School of painters

John Berney Ladbrooke (31 October 1803 – 11 July 1879) was an English landscape painter and lithographer, who was associated with the Norwich School of painters.

== Life ==
Ladbrooke was born in the English county of Norfolk on 31 October 1803. He was the third of four sons of the painter Robert Ladbrooke, all of whom were artists to varying degrees, with Henry and John Berney achieving the most success. Another brother, Robert, became a wood carver and gilder, picture cleaner, and drawing master.

He became a pupil of the Norwich artist John Crome, who was his uncle by marriage, and whose artistic style he followed. He also studied with the Norwich artist John Thirtle.

Before 1850 Ladbrooke toured the Netherlands and France. He was married to Hannah, but there were no children from the marriage. The fruit and flower painter Maria Louisa Margitson was his niece. In 1859 he built a house on Mousehold Heath. Ladbrooke died at his home in Norwich on 11 July 1879 and was buried at the nearby Rosary Cemetery.

== Artistic career ==
Ladbrooke excelled in the representation of woodland scenery. He exhibited at the Royal Academy in London in 1821 and 1822, and frequently at the British Institution and the Suffolk Street Gallery up to 1873. In 1820 he published a series of eight lithographs entitled Select Views in Norwich and its Environs, and helped his father in the production of 700 drawings and 677 lithographs for his five-volumes publication Views of the Churches of Norfolk. A successful teacher, his most notable student was John Middleton.

== Sources ==
- O'Donoghue, Freeman Marius; Hargraves, Matthew (7 January 2010). "Ladbrooke, Robert". In Watt, Norma (ed.). Oxford Dictionary of National Biography (online ed.). Oxford: Oxford University Press. doi:10.1093/ref:odnb/15870. (Subscription, Wikipedia Library access or UK public library membership required.)
