= Leslie Davenport =

20th-century British artist and teacher

Leslie Davenport (self portrait)

Frank William Leslie Davenport ARCA (21 April 1905 – 28 February 1973) was a 20th-century British artist and teacher and a member of the Norwich Twenty Group of painters.

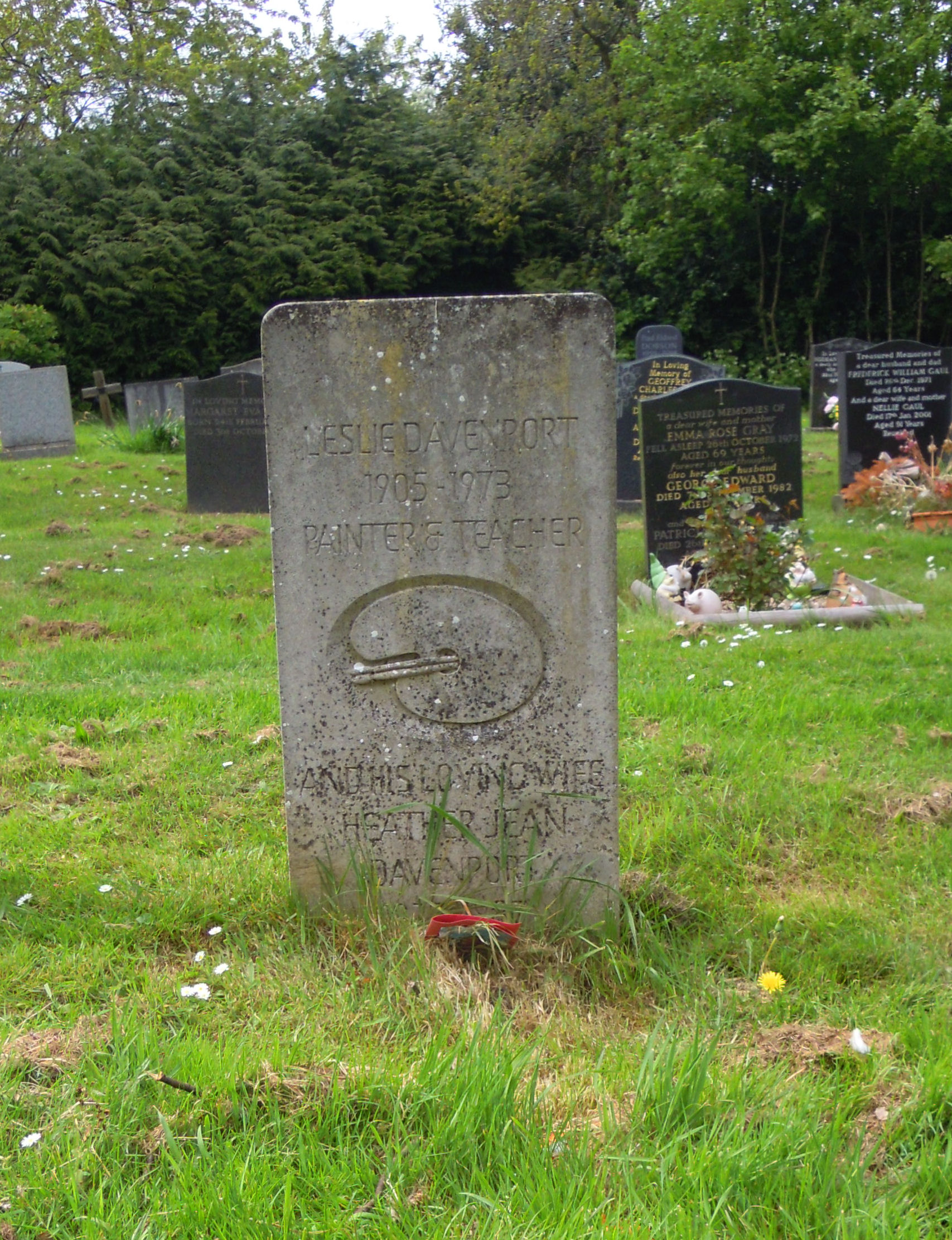
The grave of Leslie Davenport in the Rosary Cemetery, Norwich

Born in Harrow the son of Rowland Davenport and Mary Emily (née Hayward), Leslie Davenport studied at the Harrow School of Art and the Royal College of Art. He taught painting at the Oxford School of Art and later in Barnstaple and Bideford Art School in North Devon. From 1939 to 1944 during World War II he served as Aircraft Inspector in Bristol and Oxford. In 1944 he commenced teaching at the Norwich School of Art where he remained until his retirement in 1971.

He joined the Norwich Twenty Group in 1944/5 and was elected Chairman in 1950; he was a member of the Norfolk Contemporary Art Society and an Associate of the Royal College of Art (ARCA). He married Heather Jean (née Carlton, 1927-1987) in Norwich in 1954. From the mid 1950s to the early 1970s he led up to 200 artists, writers and musicians living on the beach and dunes at Winterton-on-Sea for six weeks every summer. Davenport's Norwich, a book of his painting of Norwich, was published in 1973. His paintings are held in various collections and galleries.

Davenport died in February 1973 in Norwich aged 67 and is buried with his wife in the Rosary Cemetery in Norwich in the UK. In his will he left £9,551.00.
