= Norwich Twenty Group =

Group of artists based in Norfolk, England

The Norwich Twenty Group (N20G) is a group of artists in Norfolk, England. Stimulated by contemporary art movements, the original group of 14 artists, met in November 1944, they intended to raise standards of local professional art to something worthy of the artistic history of Norfolk, by mutual criticism and appraisal of work. On 8 January 1945, they named the group the Norwich Twenty Group and a constitution was signed. N20G continues to flourish with new members. Since 1944, over 270 artists have been members. Some of the artists have included Bernard Reynolds, Edward Barker, Leslie Davenport, Michael Andrews, Mary Newcomb, Hamilton Wood, Jeffery Camp and Cavendish Morton. Since 1945 and until the end of 2013, some 150 art shows have been organised. Shows have taken place in 97 venues in Norwich, 35 in East Anglia, 11 outside East Anglia and 7 in Europe. Many of the artists trained at the Norwich School of Art and Design, now Norwich University of the Arts, Royal College of Art, Slade School of Fine Art, and other well known art schools. Many have travelled widely, studying the arts of other cultures and have exhibited regionally, nationally and internationally. Current members include 88 artists, with three life members and four honorary members. Several NUA graduates are invited to join the group every year, for one year, under the licentiate scheme. Meeting challenges in today's contemporary art, N20G now encompasses artists working in all media from paint, sculpture, installations and digital, ever seeking to nurture new members and forms of art.

== Founder members ==
=== First eight members who attended the inaugural meeting on 13 November 1944 ===
- Walter Thomas Watling (1885–1956)
- Maidie Buckingham (1901–1988)
- Henley G. Curl (1910–1989)
- Margaret Fitzsimmons-Hall
- Tom Griffiths (1901–1990)
- Aileen Law
- Wilfred S. Pettitt (1904–1978)
- Bernard Reynolds (1915–1997)

=== Next admissions in 1944/45 ===
- Edward Barker (1918–1983)
- Leslie Davenport (1905–1973)
- Leslie Moore (1913–1976)
- John Trudgill (1916–1986)
- Jim Starling (1905–1996)
- James Fletcher-Watson (1913–2004)

== Elected chairmen 1944 to present ==
Elected in:

- 1945 Walter T. Watling (1885–1956)
- 1946 Wilfred Pettitt (1904–1978)
- 1947 Henley G. Curl (1910–1989)
- 1948 Margaret Fitzsimmons-Hall
- 1950 Leslie Davenport (1905–1973)
- 1951 Ruth Barker (1925–2009)
- 1954 Noel Spencer (1900–1986)
- 1955 Cavendish Morton b.1911
- 1957 Hubert Forward (1928–1998)
- 1958 Geoffrey Wales (1912–1990)
- 1959 Jeffery Camp
- 1960 Hamilton Wood (1918–1989)
- 1961 John Rowbottom
- 1962 Ronald Courteney
- 1964 Leslie Davenport (1905–1973)
- 1966 Peter Baldwin
- 1968 Ronald Courteney
- 1971 Peter Baldwin
- 1976 Geoffrey Lefever
- 1978 Jane Mackintosh
- 1980 Richard Maguire
- 1981 Trevor Aldous
- 1983 Mike Toll
- 1985 Peter Baldwin
- 1989 Tony Mabbutt
- 1991 Peter Baldwin
- 1992 Hubert Forward (1928–1998)
- 1995 Mike Toll
- 1996 Hamilton Wood (1918–1999) Hamilton Wood (1918-1989) not correct
- 1997 Frank Pond
- 1999 Ann-Mari Stevens
- 2001 David Jones
- 2003 Joanna Reynolds
- 2005 Barry Watkins
- 2007 David Holgate (1939–2014)
- 2009 Rory McShane
- 2011 Martin Battye
- 2013 Julia Sorrell
- 2014 Linda Chapman
- 2014 Martin Battye
- 2015 Martin Laurance
- 2017 Peter Offord

== Open Meetings locations since 1944 ==
All Open Meetings are open to the public, where everyone can listen to art discussions, presentations on subjects such aesthetics, architecture, art movements, artistic disciplines, artists' own works, contemporary art scenes, critiques, formative experiences and travels abroad, imagination, photography, techniques and practical approaches, women artists and many others.

All locations were in Norwich.

- 1944 - The Chantry. The room was lent by the WEA. The inaugural meeting of the group took place on 13 November 1944
- 1945 - 32 Elm Hill. The Countess of Albemarle offered the use of this location for the meetings of the group.
- 1946 - Y.W.C.A.
- 1946 - 56 Bethel Street
- 1946 - 23 Grove Walk
- 1953 - Sir Garnet Wolseley Public House
- 1954 - Flint House Gallery
- 1955 - The Red Lion Public House
- 1955–56 - The Wild Man Pub
- 1956-73 - The Festival House
- 1973–76 - The Gibraltar Gardens Public House
- 1976–78 - The Unthank Arms Public House
- 1978 - The Arts Centre
- 1978–82 - The Golden Star Public House
- 1982–86 - The Adam & Eve Public House
- 1986–93 - Wensum Lodge
- 1993 - Contact Gallery
- 1994–95 - United Reformed Church Rooms
- Since November 1999 - The Chapel

== Exhibitions ==
Since 1945 and until 2015, some 165 art shows have been organised. Shows have taken place in 111 venues in Norwich, 35 in East Anglia, 12 outside East Anglia and 7 in Europe. The information is based on the archives of the Norwich Twenty Group. All exhibitions have always been open to the public. (Information based on the archives of the Norwich Twenty Group - list of locations/periods/titles)

1940s

- 1946 Norwich, 24 Jan. 1946 for about a month, "Social and Art Exhibition" at the YWCA Hostel.
- 1946 Norwich, July 1946, "First Public Exhibition of Painting and Sculpture" at the Jarrolds Art Gallery.
- 1947 Norwich, 4–29 June 1947, "20 Group Exhibition of Recent Work" at the Castle Museum.
- 1947 Dereham, 3–9 July 1947, "Exhibition as an Experiment", Exhibition of recent works of modern Norwich Artists at The Assembly Rooms.
- 1948 Norwich, June 1948, "Twenty Group Exhibition" Exhibition of painting, sculpture and works in black and white at the Castle Museum.
- 1948 Great Yarmouth, July 1948, "Exhibition of painting, sculpture and works in black and white" at the Yarmouth Public Library.
- 1949 Norwich, 8–25 June 1949, "Annual Exhibition" at Suckling House.
- 1949 Lowestoft, 5–19 July 1949, "Annual Exhibition" at the Lowestoft Art Centre.
- 1949 Great Yarmouth, 23 July-6 August 1949, "Annual Exhibition" at the Great Yarmouth Public Library & Museum.

1950s

- 1950 Norwich, 8–16 July 1950, "Open Air Exhibition" Exhibition of Drawings, Paintings, Sculpture at the Castle Gardens.
- 1951 Norwich, 18 June–July 1951, "Festival Exhibition" Exhibition of Drawings, Paintings, Sculpture at the Cathedral Cloisters, Norwich Cathedral.
- 1952 Lowestoft, 15–23 February 1952, "Exhibition" Drawing, Painting and Sculpture at the Lowestoft Art Centre.
- 1952 Norwich, June 1952, "Spring Exhibition" Exhibition of paintings, drawings and sculpture at the Castle Museum.
- 1953 Norwich, Oct. 1953, "Exhibition by Teachers of Painting, Sculpture and Graphic Design" – Geoffrey Wales, Hubert Forward and John Rowbottom, Members of the Norwich Twenty Group at the Art School, St. George's.
- 1953 Wells-Next-the-Sea, 28 July-2 Aug. 1952, "Exhibition" at the Centre.
- 1953 Norwich, 7–21 May 1953, "Spring Exhibition" Exhibition of paintings, drawings and sculpture at the Castle Museum.
- 1954 Norwich, 29 May-15 June 1954, "1954 Exhibition" Annual Exhibition of drawing, painting and sculpture at the Castle Museum.
- 1955 Norwich, 26 Nov.-10 Dec. 1955, "Little Winter Exhibition" Exhibition of drawing, painting and sculpture at the Flint House Gallery.
- 1955 Norwich, Mar.1955, "Exhibition" at the Castle Museum.
- 1956 Norwich, 2–16 June 1956, "Exhibition" at Curl's New Store.
- 1956 Lynn, 12-22 Oct. 1956, "First Exhibition held outside of Norwich" at the Undercroft, Guildhall of St George.
- 1956 Hintlesham, summer 1956, "Exhibition of sculpture" at the Hintlesham Festival.
- 1956 Eye, "Exhibition in aid of the Hungarian Relief Fund".
- 1957 Aldeburgh, summer 1957, "Exhibition of sculpture" at the Aldeburgh Festival.
- 1957 Norwich, 22 June-6 July 1957, "Annual Exhibition" of Painting, Drawing, and Sculpture - a number of sculptures were shown in the garden of the Assembly House.
- 1958 Norwich, Feb.-Mar. 1958, "Annual Exhibition of painting and sculpture" at the Castle Museum.
- 1959 Norwich, 16–30 May 1959, "Annual Exhibition of painting, sculpture and engraving" at the Assembly House.

1960s

- 1960 Norwich, 1-28 Feb. 1960, "Exhibition of painting, sculpture and engraving" at the Castle Museum.
- 1961 Norwich, 11-25 Feb. 1961, "Exhibition of recent works of Painting, Sculpture and Engraving" at the Assembly House.
- 1961 Norwich, 27-May-11 June 1961, "Triennial Festival - Exhibition of Drawing, Painting & Sculpture" at the Cathedral Cloisters.
- 1962 Norwich, 21 April-13 May 1962, "Spring Exhibition" Exhibition of recent works of Painting, Sculpture and Engraving at the Castle Museum.
- 1962 Ipswich, 28 May-8 June 1962, "Exhibition of paintings, engravings and sculpture" at the Civic College Foyer.
- 1963 Great Yarmouth, 1-27 Apr. 1963, "Norwich 20 Group Exhibition" at the Great Yarmouth Public Library & Museum.
- 1963 Norwich, 12-26 Oct. 1963, "Exhibition of recent works of painting, sculpture and engraving" at the Assembly House.
- 1964 Norwich, 30 May-21 June 1964, "20-Group Exhibition" Exhibition featured in the Norwich Triennial at the Castle Museum.
- 1965 Diss, Apr.1965, "Co-operative Exhibition between the Diss Society for Music and the Arts and the Norwich Twenty Group".
- 1965 Norwich, 1–30 May 1965, "Exhibition" at the Castle Museum.
- 1965 Fakenham,10-15 May 1965, "Exhibition" at the Fakenham Festival of Music and The Arts.
- 1965 Norwich, spring 1965, "20 Group Exhibition" at the Library, University of East Anglia.
- 1965 Norwich, Nov.1965, "Exhibition" at Tom Watts' shop.
- 1966 Norwich, 7–28 May 1966, "Exhibition of painting, sculpture and print making" , University of East Anglia.
- 1966 Aldeburgh, 10-26 Sept.1966, "Aldeburgh Exhibition" at the Festival Gallery.
- 1966 Norwich, 5-27 Nov. 1966, "Annual Exhibition" at the Castle Museum.
- 1966 Norwich, Dec. 1966-Jan.1967, "Exhibition" at the Bedford Grill.
- 1967 Norwich, 1–10 June 1967, "20 Group in Cloisters" Triennial Festival Exhibition at the Cathedral Cloisters.
- 1967 Norwich, 4-26 Nov. 1967, "Annual Exhibition" Exhibition of Drawing, Painting and Sculpture at the Castle Museum.
- 1968 Oxford, 17 June-31 July 1968, "Exhibition" at the Oxford Gallery.
- 1968 Sudbury, 6–28 July 1968, "Exhibition" at Gainsborough's House.
- 1968 Norwich, 18 Nov.-7 Dec. 1968, "Annual Exhibition" at the Maddermarket Theatre.
- 1969 London, Jan.-Febr.1969, "Exhibition of East Anglian Artists" including many of the N20G Members at the Royal Institute Gallery.
- 1969 Norwich, 17 Nov.-6 Dec. 1969, "Annual Exhibition" at the Maddermarket Theatre.

1970s

- 1970 Norwich, 28 Febr.-29 Mar. 1970, "Norwich Twenty Group Annual Exhibition" at the Castle Museum.
- 1970 NORFOLK, 17-18 Oct. 1970, "Artists at Home" Norfolk & Norwich Triennial Festival.
- 1971 Norwich, 6-28 Febr.1971, "Annual Exhibition" at the Castle Museum.
- 1971 King's Lynn,5-24 Apr.1971, "Exhibition of Paintings and Sculpture" at the Fermoy Art Gallery.
- 1971 Norwich, 14 May–June 1971, "Exhibition" at the Norwich Theatre Royal.
- 1972 Norwich, 17 Apr.-6 May 1972, "Annual Exhibition" at the Cow Gallery.
- 1972 Norwich, 11 Nov.-10 Dec. 1972, "Annual Exhibition" at the Castle Museum.
- 1973 Halesworth, 7–20 July 1973, "Exhibition" at the Halesworth Gallery.
- 1974 Norwich, 2 Feb.-3 Mar.1974, "Annual Exhibition with a special tribute to Leslie Davenport" Exhibition of drawings, paintings, prints, sculpture at the Castle Museum.
- 1975 Ipswich, 12 April-10 May 1975, "Exhibition of paintings, drawings, prints, sculpture" at the Art Gallery.
- 1975 Norwich, 11 Oct.-16 Nov. 1975, "Annual Exhibition" Exhibition of paintings, drawings, prints, sculpture at the Castle Museum.
- 1976 King's Lynn, 1–27 March 1976, "Exhibition" at the Fermoy Gallery.
- 1976 Halesworth, 12–25 June 1976, "Exhibition" at the Halesworth Gallery.
- 1977 Norwich, 23 Jan.-21 Feb. 1977, "Annual Exhibition of Paintings, Drawings Prints & Sculpture" with a performance by Jill Bruce and Bruce Lacey called "Awakening in the Eye of the Bird" at the Castle Museum.
- 1978 Norwich, 11 Nov.-10 Dec. 1978, "Annual Exhibition" at the Castle Museum.
- 1979 (information to be updated at a later date)

1980s

- 1980 Norwich, 7 June - 6 July 1980, "Retrospective Exhibition 1944–1980" at the Castle Museum.
- 1981 Norwich, 2-20 Mar. 1981, "Annual Show" at the Library Concourse, University of East Anglia, Norwich Research Park.
- 1982 Norwich, "Annual Exhibition" including a number of guest artists' works (information to be updated at a later date)
- 1983 Great Yarmouth, 16 Apr.-7 May 1983, "Norwich Twenty Group and Great Yarmouth College of Art Staff Exhibition" at the Great Yarmouth Public Library & Museum.
- 1983 Norwich, 9-28 Oct.1983, "Annual Exhibition, including a tribute to Edward Barker, 1918–1983" one of the founder-members, at the University of East Anglia.
- 1984 Ipswich, 12–27 May 1984, "Exhibition" during the Ipswich Arts Festival at the Galleries Cornhill.
- 1984 Halesworth, 28 July-10 Aug.1984, "The Norwich Twenty Group Exhibition" at the Halesworth Gallery.
- 1984 Norwich, 29 Sept.-21 Oct.1984, "Annual Exhibition" including works from guests artists mostly from the Norwich Artists Group at the Castle Museum.
- 1985 Norwich, 27 May-8 June 1985, "Prints & Drawings Exhibition" at Wensum Lodge.
- 1985 Norwich, 21-27 Oct. 1985, "Triennial Festival Exhibition" at the Maddermarket Theatre.
- 1986 Norwich, 1-30 Nov. 1986, "Annual Exhibition" at the Castle Museum.
- 1987 Norwich, 20 June-6 July 1987, "Summer Exhibition" at the Maddermarket Theatre.
- 1988 Norwich, 3-28 Oct. 1988, "Norwich Twenty Group's French Festival – Art Exhibition" Exhibition of paintings by Norwich 20-Group during the Norfolk & Norwich Triennial Festival at the Maddermarket Theatre.
- 1989 Norwich, 4 Mar.-2 Apr. 1989, "Norfolk Art Now" Exhibition organised by the Norwich 20 Group. An expansive exhibition to include works from artists resident in Norfolk, at the Castle Museum.
- 1989 Norwich, autumn 1989, "Art in the Office" at the offices of Ashwyn Cavill Associates.

1990s

- 1990 Norwich, 25 Sept.-20 Oct. 1990, "2020 Exhibition of Paintings - 20th Century" Annual Exhibition at the Maddermarket Theatre.
- 1991 Norwich, 7 Oct.-2 Nov. 1991, "Festival Exhibition" Annual Exhibition at the Maddermarket Theatre.
- 1992 Norwich, 28 Sept.-24 Oct,1992, "Festival Exhibition, Annual Exhibition" at the Maddermarket Theatre.
- 1993 Norwich, 18 Sept.-17 Oct. 1993, "Festival" Exhibition, the theme of the Festival was "Russia" and "Curtain Up", during the Norfolk and Norwich Festival at the Maddermarket Theatre.
- 1993 Norwich, 20 Nov. 1993-9 Jan.1994, "The Castle Art Show" Annual Exhibition at the Castle Museum. Including works from the Norfolk Contemporary Craft Society, Norfolk and Norwich Art Circle, Norwich Artists Group, Norwich School of Art and Design, Norwich Twenty Group, St. Etheldreda Art Studio and the Warehouse Artists Studios. The City celebrated the 800th anniversary of the Norwich City Charter and the centenary year of Norwich Castle Museum.
- 1994 Norwich, 26 Sept.-21 Oct.1994, "Annual Exhibition" a Norfolk & Norwich Festival Exhibition at the Maddermarket Theatre.
- 1995 Norwich, 24 Sept.-Oct. 1995, "Annual Show" at the Maddermarket Theatre.
- 1995 Norwich, 9 Dec.1995-21 Jan. 1996, "The Castle Art Show" at the Castle Museum. Including works from the Norfolk Contemporary Craft Society, Norfolk and Norwich Art Circle, Norwich Artists Group, Norwich School of Art and Design, Norwich Twenty Group, St. Etheldreda Art Studio and the Warehouse Artists Studios.
- 1996 Norwich, 7–19 May 1996, "Annual Exhibition" at St. Margaret's Church.
- 1996 Norwich, 24 May-6 June 1996, "E 227, N 088" Paintings by T.P. Nash Sculptures by J.B.E. Riches at St. Margaret's Church.
- 1996 Norwich, 4 July-26 Sept. 1996, 50th Anniversary Exhibition, 1946–1996" An exhibition of collected works from past and present members of The Norwich Twenty Group 1946–1996, 48 works from present members. Also included were general memorabilia (books, drawings and cards) and early documentation (book illustration, a gift to the Barker Family from Frank Allen (1896–1977) [c.1965], press cuttings, invitations, letters, etc.) at the Advice Arcade Gallery.
- 1996 Norwich, July 1996, "Exhibition to celebrate the 50th Anniversary Exhibition of The Norwich Twenty Group 1946–1996" Exhibition showing works from Bernard Reynolds (1915–1997), Ron Courtney, Brian Thaxton and Frank Pond (former students of the college) at the City of Norwich School.
- 1997 Norwich, 14 June-3 July 1997, "Annual Exhibition with a tribute to Bernard Reynolds (1915–1997), President of The Norwich Twenty Group" at St. Margaret's Church.
- 1997 Sheringham, 20 Sept.-25 Oct. 1997, "3 out of 20" An Exhibition by Mike Toll, Peter Baldwin & Frank Pond, all members of the Norwich Twenty Group at the Little Theatre.
- 1997 Norwich, 6 Oct.1997-14 Jan. 1998, "Leslie Davenport, Man and Artist" An Exhibition celebrating the life and work of Leslie Davenport (1905–1973), Leading light of the Norwich Twenty Group at the Advice Arcade Gallery.
- 1998 Norwich, 31 Mar.-17 Apr.1998, "A Tradition in Innovation" at the John Innes Centre.
- 1998 Norwich, 6–17 July 1998, "Forward With The 20 Group, with a tribute to Hugh Forward 1928–98 Exhibition" at St. Margaret's Church.
- 1999 Norwich, 22 Mar.-1 Apr.1999, "Still Growing Strong in John Innes No. 2" at the John Innes Centre.
- 1999 Norwich, 18-30 Oct. 1999, "Riches of The 20 Group with a tribute to John Riches 1941–1999" at Location: St. Margaret's Church.

2000s

- 2000 Norwich, 9–26 May 2000, "norwich20group at johninnes go ok" at the John Innes Centre.
- 2000 Norwich, 9–20 July, 23 July to 3 August, 6–17 August 2000, "Norwich Artists Group 3 Shows" at the Norwich Art School Gallery.
- 2000 Blicking, 6-17 Sept. 2000, "Off The Wall" Exhibition of portable pictures for sale at the Lothian Barn.
- 2000 Norwich, 2-14 Oct.2000, "20/20 Vision" Exhibition at St. Margaret's Church.
- 2001 GISSING, Diss, 18 Jan.-24 Febr. 2001, "Built" at Gissing Arts.
- 2001 Norwich, 22 May to 2 June 2001, "Free Radicals" Exhibition at the John Innes Centre.
- 2001 Blickling, 22 Aug.-15 Sept. 2001, "Exhibition" at the Lothian Barn.
- 2001 Norwich, 1-13 Oct. 2001, "Under One Roof" at St. Margaret's Church.
- 2002 Norwich, 21 May-8 June 2002, "N20G@JI2002" Exhibition at the John Innes Centre.
- 2002 Blickling, 28 Aug.-8 Sept. 2002, "Off the Wall 3, Art to Go" Exhibition, Buy & Take Away Show at the Lothian Barn.
- 2002 Norwich, 6-9 Oct. 2002, "Annual Autumn Exhibition" at St. Margaret's Church.
- 2003 Norwich, 3–21 June 2003, "2003 Spring Exhibition, with a tribute to Tony Stocker (1939–2003)" at the John Innes Centre.
- 2003 Blickling, 20–31 August 2003, "Off The Wall 4, Art to Go" at the Lothian Barn.
- 2003 Norwich, 22 Sept.-4 Oct. 2003, "2003 Autumn Exhibition" at St. Margaret's Church.
- 2004 Norwich, 4–14 May 2004, "2004 Annual Spring Exhibition, with a tribute to Kay Ohsten (1935–2003)" at the John Innes Centre.
- 2004 Blicking, 1-6 Sept. 2004, "Blickling Pieces of 8" Exhibition by eight members of The Norwich Twenty Group at the Estate Barn Gallery.
- 2004 Norwich, 27 Sept. to 9 Oct. 2004, "Autumn Exhibition 2004"at St. Margaret's Church.
- 2005 Norwich, 11–26 June 2005, "60 Years of Art" at the Old Bally Shoe Factory Ltd.
- 2005 Salthouse, 11-29 Aug. 2005, "Summer at Salthouse" at St Nicholas' Church.
- 2006 Lowestoft, 5–27 May 2006, "Exhibition" at the Warehouse Gallery.
- 2006 Novi Sad, Serbia, 25 July Aug. 2006, "International Festival of Art Flags" International Exhibition—artists from the eight cities twinned with Novi Sad (from Greece, China, Romania, Germany, UK and others...) provided ten flags each in Novi Sad, Serbia.
- 2006 Norwich, 1-15 Sept. 2006, "Art Sans Frontières " International Exhibition, with Twin Cities of Rouen, Novi Sad and El Viejo at the Old Bally Shoe Factory Ltd.
- 2007 Rouen, France, 17 Feb.-3 Mar. 2007, "50 Artistes d'Aujourd'hui d'Ici et de Norwich" International Exhibition organised by ANC, Atelier Normand Creation.
- 2007 Norwich, 6-18 Aug. 2007, "Art Exhibition" at the United Reformed Church.
- 2007 Norwich, 18-29 Sept. 2007, "Art Sans Frontières Deux" International Exhibition of New Twin Cities work at the Old Bally Shoe Factory Ltd.
- 2008 Rouen, France, 17 Feb. to 3 Mar. 2008, "Exhibition" International Exhibition organised by ANC Atelier Normand Creation at Halle aux Toiles.
- 2008 Wymondham, 21 June to 13 July 2008, "Barry Watkins and Mary Spicer from Norwich Twenty Group", Festival Art Exhibition at Wymondham Abbey.
- 2008 Norwich, 15-27 Sept.2008, "Art Sans Frontières Trois" International Exhibition of New Twin Cities work at the Old Bally Shoe Factory Ltd.
- 2008 Novi Sad, Serbia, June 2008, "Grupa 20 - 20 Group", Exhibition of Paintings by 8 N20G Artists - Ruthli Losh-Atkinson, Ann-Mari Stevens, Dorothy Ransome, Barry Watkins, John Tuckett, Geoffrey Lefever, Stuart Edward Shearer, Derek Rae, Galerija Vojvodanske banke, Novi Sad, Trg slobode 5, Serbia.
- 2009 Rouen, France, 7-22 Mar. 2009, "50 Artistes d'Aujourd'hui d'Ici et de Norwich" organised by ANC, Atelier Normand Creation, 39e Salon. International Exhibition at Halle aux Toiles.
- 2009 Novi Sad, Serbia, 2009, "International Exhibition" in Novi Sad, Serbia.
- 2009 Norwich, 11–23 May 2009, "Voicing Visions" Spring Exhibition of Painting, Sculpture and Poetry includes a CD or recorded poems by Writers who teamed with Artists, 47 N20G Members and 42 Poets at St. Margaret's Church.
- 2009 Norwich, 7-19 Sept. 2009, "Four Sight" International Exhibition - Fourth Exhibition of work from Four Cities, exhibition of artworks from Koblenz, Novi Sad, Rouen and Norwich at the Old Bally Shoe Factory Ltd.

2010s

- 2010 Norwich, 11–22 May 2010, "It Takes Two – Norwich 20 Group Artists Collaborate" Spring Exhibition at St. Margaret's Church.
- 2010 Norwich, 27 Aug.-15 Sept. 2010, "Summer Exhibition" at John Innes Centre.
- 2010 Norwich, 18-23 Oct. 2010, "Naked in Norwich" at St. Margaret's Church.
- 2011 Koblenz, Germany, 3-17 Apr. 2011, "Variations in Landscape" International Exhibition of the Norwich Twenty Group in Haus Metternich.
- 2011 Norwich, May, 2011, "Twin Visions" International Exhibition at the Forum.
- 2011 Norwich, 3 June 31 July 2011, "Dance" Exhibition at the Norwich Theatre Royal.
- 2011 Norwich, 22 June to 2 July 2011, "Naked in Norwich 2" at St. Margaret's Church.
- 2012 Norwich, 14-28 Jan. 2012, "Two-oh-for-two-oh-one-two" Exhibition at the Forum.
- 2012 Norwich, 14–28 May 2012, "Looking Into Twenty" Exhibition of recent works, with a tribute to Keith Pomeroy (1948–2012) at the Forum.
- 2012 Bury St. Edmunds, 16 May to 28 July 2012, "Festival" Exhibition of original artwork which reflect the artists' personal responses to gatherings of people who celebrate music, performance, belief and common interests from the past to the present at the Apex Gallery, The Apex.
- 2012 Norwich, 25–30 June 2012, "Naked in Norwich 3" at St. Margaret's Church.
- 2012 Bethnal Green, London, 5-11 Dec. 2012, "Norwich 20 Group" Exhibition by 11 artists at the Espacio Gallery.
- 2013 Norwich, 20 Jan.-16 Feb. 2013, "Light on the Landscape" at Mandell's Gallery. Art Exhibition by Martin Laurance, long-standing Member of The Norwich Twenty Group.
- 2013 Halesworth, 12 Feb.-16 Mar. 2013, "Art Exhibition" at The Cut. Art Exhibition by Geoffrey Lefever & Martin Battye, long-standing Members of The Norwich Twenty Group. Geoffrey Lefever was one of the former chairmen and Martin Battye is current chairman.
- 2013 Norwich, 15-21 Apr. 2013, "Less is More" at The Forum. 3D Work by four Norfolk artists, members of The Norwich 20 Group, Mary Mellor, Derek Morris, Vanessa Pooley, Andrew Schumann
- 2013 Lowestoft, 3 May-3 June 2013, "Art Exhibition" at Ferrini Art Gallery. Art exhibition by Peter Baldwin and Maggy Knight, Peter Baldwin is a long-standing member of The Norwich 20 Group and one of the former chairmen.
- 2013 Norwich, 20–26 May 2013, "Norwich Twenty Group - Spring Show" at The Forum.
- 2013 Wymondham, 21 May-2 June 2013, "Drawn Together, an exhibition of work by Katarzyna Coleman" at Wymondham Arts Centre.
- 2013 Wymondham, 18–23 June 2013, "Jane Mackintosh, Paintings and Drawings" at Wymondham Arts Centre.
- 2013 Salthouse, 23 June-7 July 2013, "Twenty Group Next The Sea" at St. Nicholas' Church.
- 2013 Norwich, 24–29 June 2013, "Naked in Norwich 4" at St. Margaret's Church.
- 2014 Norwich, from 24 January to 23 April 2014 at The Theatre Royal.
- 2014 Norwich, from 17–31 March 2014 "20 Now 70 - Norwich 20 Group Artists' 70th anniversary exhibition" at The Forum.
- 2014 Norwich, from 17–31 March 2014 "20 Group Underground" at The Undercroft.
- 2014 Norwich, from 14 March 2014, new exhibitions every two months at The City Frames Gallery.
- 2014 Norwich, from 18 March to 24 May 2014 "The Norwich 20 Group - 70 years 1944–2014" at The Museum of Norwich at the Bridewell.
- 2014 Norwich, from 3–9 August 2014 "Naked in Norwich 5" at St. Margaret's Church.
- 2014 Norwich, from 27–28 October 2014 "The Big Draw" at The Forum.
- 2014 Norwich, from 21 November 2014 to 5 January 2015 at The Anteros Arts Foundation.
- 2014 Norwich, from November 2014 to January 2015 at Norwich Castle Museum.
- 2014 Norwich, from 13 December 2014 to 10 January 2015 at Mandell's Gallery.
- 2015 Norwich, 12–24 January 2015 "We are here already" at The Forum.
- 2015 Norwich, June 2015 at The Undercroft.
- 2015 Norwich, 23 July - 15 October 2015 at The Theatre Royal.
- 2015 Norwich, 3–8 August 2015 "Naked in Norwich 6" at St. Margaret's Church.
- 2015 Snape Maltings, 3–4 October 2015 "The Big Draw en plein air at the FlipSide Festival" at Snape Maltings Retailing.
- 2016 Norwich, from 19 and 20 February 2016 "The Big Draw" at The Forum.
- 2016 Norwich, from 4 to 15 July 2016 "Eastern Horizons" at The Forum.
- 2016 Norwich, 26 July to 8 August 2016 Art Show, "Never Mind the B*** Art Show, Here's the 20 Group" at The Undercroft.
- 2016 Norwich, July - September 2016 "Works on Paper" at The Theatre Royal.
- 2016 Norwich, 8–13 August 2016 "Naked in Norwich 7" at St. Margaret's Church.
- 2018 Norwich, 5–29 June 2018 Art Show, "H2O: The Art of Wet" at The Undercroft.
- 2018 Norwich, 9–26 May 2018 Art Show, "Changes" at The Undercroft.
- 2018 Norwich, 6–7 April 2018 "The Big Draw" part of the Makers'Month at The Forum.

== Collections ==
- Norwich 20 Group: Sixty Years of Art, 2005. ISBN 0-9551957-0-5

Other relevant publications:

- Davenport's Norwich, 1973, no ISBN, published by Wensum Books (Norwich) Ltd
- Norwich - the Growth of a City, Barbara Green and Rachel M.R. Young, 1981, Norfolk Museums Service, ISBN 0-903101-37-8
- A Happy Eye A school of Art in Norwich 1845–1982, Marjorie Allthorpe-Guyton with John Stevens, 1982, ISBN 0-7117-0028-1
- Norfolk & Norwich Art Circle 1885–1985: a history of the Circle, and the centenary exhibition, 1985, ISBN 0-9510711-0-6
- The Printed Plans of Norwich 1558–1840 - A Carto-Bibliography, Raymond Frostick, 2002, ISBN 0-9542471-0-8 / 978-0954 247 102
- Wide Skies - a century of painting and painters in Norfolk, Adrienne May and Brian Watts,Published 2003 by Halsgrove, ISBN 1-84114-297-2 / 978-11841 142 975
- Fifty Years On - a brief history of the first 50 years of the Norfolk Contemporary Art Society 1956–2006, Published 2006 by the Norfolk Contemporary Art Society
- The Sculptor Bernard Reynolds, Bernard Reynolds (1915–1997), Gwynneth Reynolds and Pat Hurrell, 2009, ISBN 978-1-906593-29-2
- Conversations with Cavendish Morton, Bella Janson, 2012, ISBN 978-0-957246-10-2
- Public Sculpture of Norfolk and Suffolk, Richard Cocke with photography by Sarah Cocke, 2013, ISBN 978 1846 317125
