= Maidie Buckingham =

Florence Maidie Buckingham (known as Maidie Buckingham; 26 May 1901 – 4 June 1988) was a British artist, sculptor, and founding member of the Norwich Twenty Group.

== Life ==
Florence Maidie Buckingham was born in Norwich on 26 May 1901. She was the daughter of Ernest H. Buckingham, F.R.I.B.A., and niece of painter Ethel Buckingham. Like her aunt, she studied at the Norwich School of Art.

Buckingham was well-known as an artist in Norwich during her lifetime. She created plaques of a number of famous figures, including Thomas John Barnardo.

In 1926, Buckingham produced a plaque portrait of John Bowers, former Bishop of Thetford, from which a cast was taken for Norwich Cathedral. In 1984, the original plaster plaque was unveiled at North Creake parish church, following a gift from Buckingham to Bowers' grandsons.

Around 1927, Buckingham produced a bronze plaque to William Fellowes of Shotesham Park for the Norfolk and Norwich Hospital. In 1933, she produced a bronze tablet depicting the Bishop of Winchester for Leicester Cathedral. In 1949, Buckingham was responsible for a war memorial plaque commissioned by the Norwich Union Life Insurance Society, representing "youth holding the torch of freedom and kneeling on the serpent of evil. In 1959, a bronze relief of Walter Nugent Monck by Buckingham was unveiled as part of a memorial at the Maddermarket Theatre in Norwich, which Monck had founded.

On 13 November 1944, Buckingham was one of eight members to attend the inaugural meeting of the Norwich Twenty Group (originally made up of 14 artists).
