= John Thirtle =

English landscape painter (1777–1839)

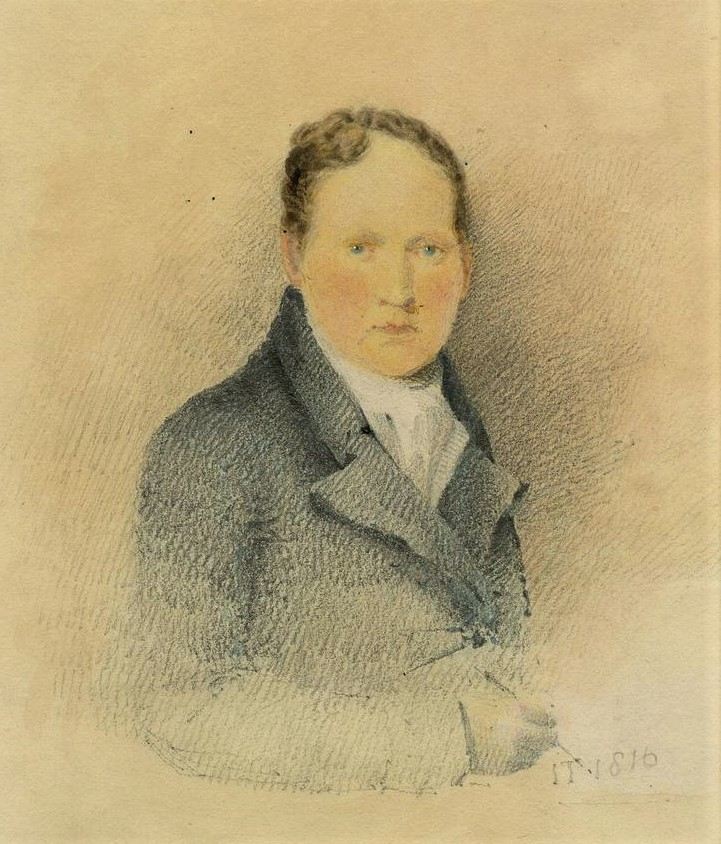
- Self-portrait of Thirtle in 1816
- Born: Baptised 22 June 1777; Norwich, England
- Died: 30 September 1839 (aged 62); Norwich, England
- Resting place: Rosary Cemetery, Norwich; 52.62747°N 1.31470°E
- Education: Apprenticeships in Norwich and London
- Known for: Watercolour landscape painting, frame-making
- Movement: Norwich School of painters
- Spouse: Elizabeth Miles (m. 1812)

John Thirtle (baptised 22 June 1777 – 30 September 1839) was an English watercolour artist and frame-maker. Born in Norwich, where he lived for most of his life, he was a leading member of the Norwich School of painters.

Much of Thirtle's life is undocumented. After working as an apprentice to a London frame-maker, he returned to Norwich to establish his own frame-making business. During his career he also worked as a drawing-master, a printseller and a looking glass maker. He produced frames for paintings by several members of the Norwich School, including John Crome and John Sell Cotman. Throughout his working life he continued to paint. In 1812 he married Elizabeth Miles, the sister of Cotman's wife Ann. Thirtle suffered from tuberculosis during the last two decades of his life, and his worsening health reduced his artistic output up to his death in 1839. His Manuscript Treatise on Watercolour, unpublished before 1977, was probably for his own use, and he exhibited fewer than 100 paintings. A member of the Norwich Society of Artists, he briefly served as its vice-president, but in 1816 was one of the artists who seceded from the Society to form a separate association, the Norfolk and Norwich Society of Artists, which dissolved after three years.

The majority of Thirtle's watercolours are of Norwich and the surrounding Norfolk countryside, many being riverside scenes. His style, influenced by Thomas Girtin, Crome and (to a lesser extent) Cotman, was technically accomplished. His earlier landscapes were painted with a restricted range of buffs, blues and grey-browns, but he later developed a brilliancy of colour, producing works that included angular block forms. The quality of several of his watercolours has deteriorated owing to the fading of the indigo pigment that he used extensively.

== Life ==
=== Family, early life and apprenticeship ===
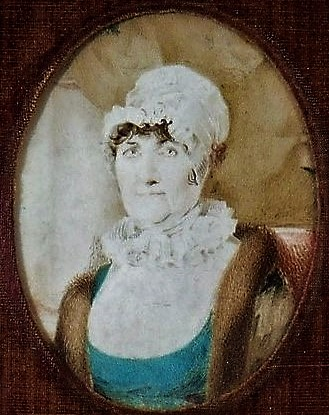
Thirtle's portrait miniature of his mother Susannah (undated)

Much of the biographical detail about John Thirtle is undocumented, and little is known of his life. The son of John Thirtle and his wife Susanna Lincoln, he was probably born in a house close to St Saviour's Church, Norwich, and was baptised at that church on 22 June 1777. (Note: The baptism record for a child named John Thurtle [sic], christened 22 June 1777, can be found in "Archdeacons transcripts for Norwich parishes, 1600–1812".) A sister, Rachel, was baptised on 13 August 1780 and a younger brother named James was baptised in 1785. His parents were well-known members of the local community. His father, who worked in Elephant Yard off Magdalen Street as a bootmaker and an overseer of the poor, was a churchwarden at St Saviour's. Few details are known of Thirtle's boyhood or education.

In 1790, the 13-year-old John was apprenticed to Benjamin Jagger of Norwich, the leading carver, gilder, picture dealer and printmaker in the city. (Note: Benjamin Jagger of London Lane, Norwich, started business carving and gilding picture frames in 1764. By 1773 he was advertising his skills as a drawing master: ... have received Instructions from the most eminent Masters of London in the new and expedious Method of Painting Pictures in Oil ... [he] engages to teach Ladies and Gentlemen the Art in a few Lessons, so as any Person may be able to paint History or other Pictures in an elegant and pleasing Manner.) In about 1799 Thirtle moved to London to serve an apprenticeship to make picture frames, possibly under a Mr. Allwood. During this apprenticeship he studied the pictures of John Sell Cotman at Rudolph Ackermann's print shop at 96, The Strand.

=== Return to Norwich and subsequent career ===
==== Frame-making business ====
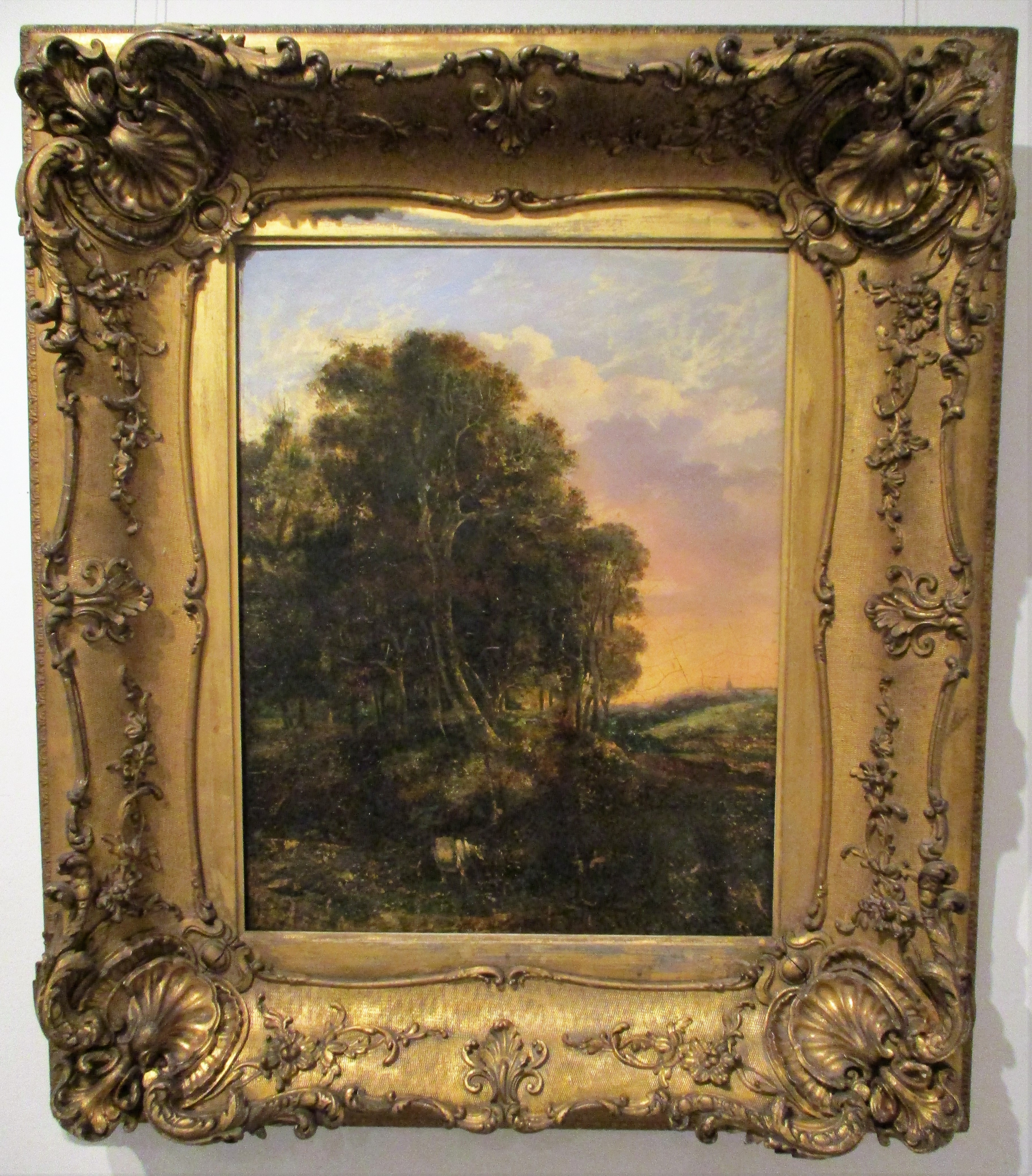
John Berney Crome, Woodland Scene (undated), in a frame made by Thirtle

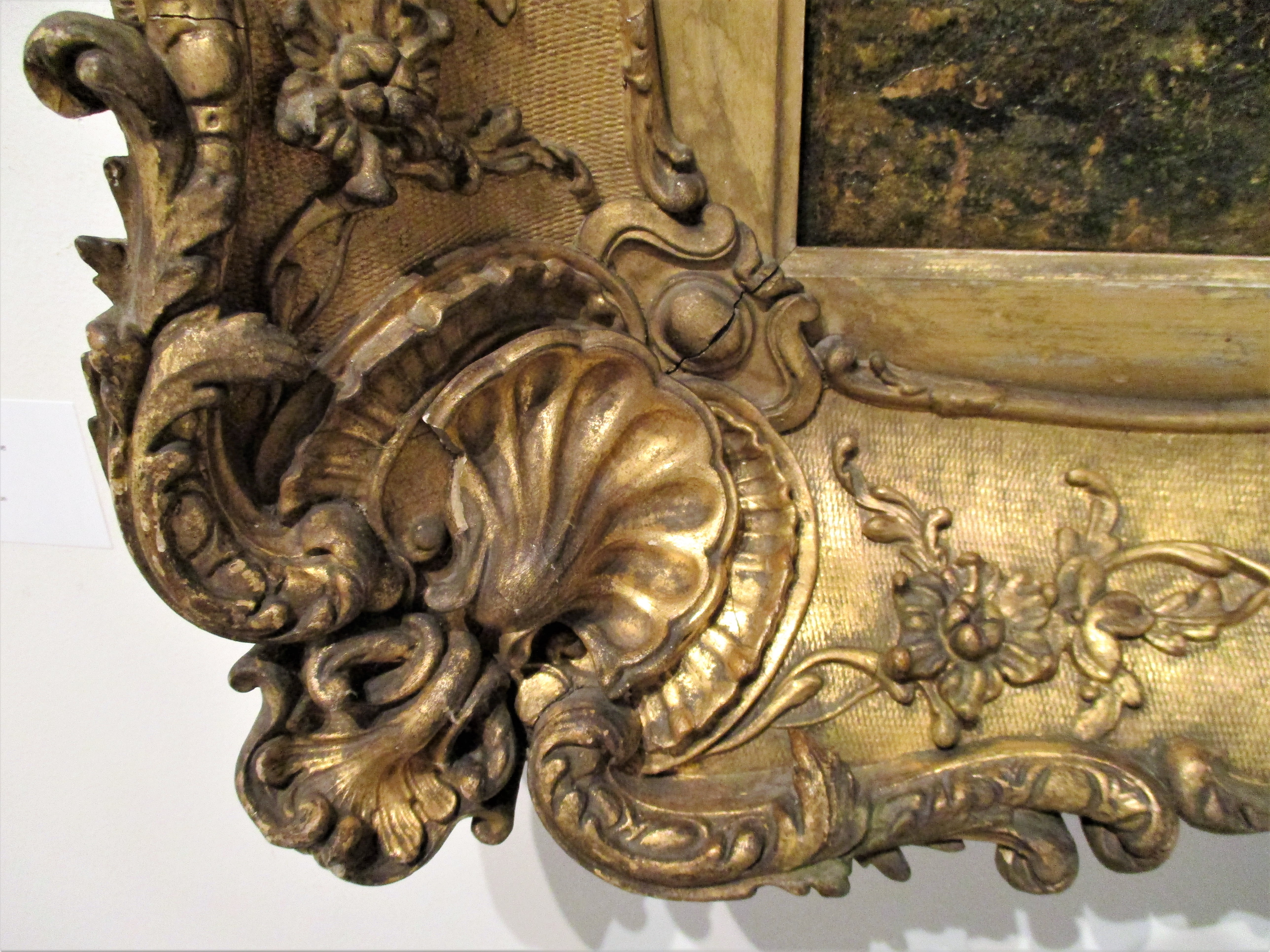
Detail of Thirtle's frame

On the successful completion of his apprenticeship in 1805, Thirtle returned to Norwich, where he showed five paintings at an exhibition of the Norwich Society of Artists, and set himself up to produce picture frames and prints in a shop in Magdalen Street. Afterwards, he rarely left his home city again. In 1806, when he had already established himself as a picture framer and gilder in Norwich, he described himself in the Society's catalogue as a "Miniature Painter and Drawing Master". His business activities, and particularly the production of his decorative picture frames, led to his becoming one of the more financially successful members of the Norwich School of painters, despite strong competition from Jeremiah and William Freeman, who dominated the Norwich framing market during this period.

Paintings by members of the Norwich School were framed by Thirtle, including those by Cotman, John Crome, Thomas Lound, James Sillett, and Joseph Stannard. (Note: Some of Thirtle's framing moulds were presented to the Bridewell Museum, Norwich in 1948.) When Thirtle framed George Vincent's oil painting Trowse Meadows, near Norwich (first exhibited in 1828), he made a watercolour version of it. His trade label took several forms, ranging from the early 'Thirtle, Miniature Painter, & Drawing Master' to the elaborate 'Carver, Gilder, Picture Frame and Looking Glass Manufacturer, Wholesale and Retail', used in the 1830s.

Paintings still in Thirtle's frames can be dated from before 1839, the year he died. William Boswell, who took over the business that year, initially included 'Late Thirtle' in brackets on his labels. In 1922, W. Boswell & Son acknowledged in one of their publications that "Thirtle was a well-known frame-maker, and the maker of the now famous swept frame, which has never been equalled, he also was, and still is an artist of no small repute."

==== Artistic career ====
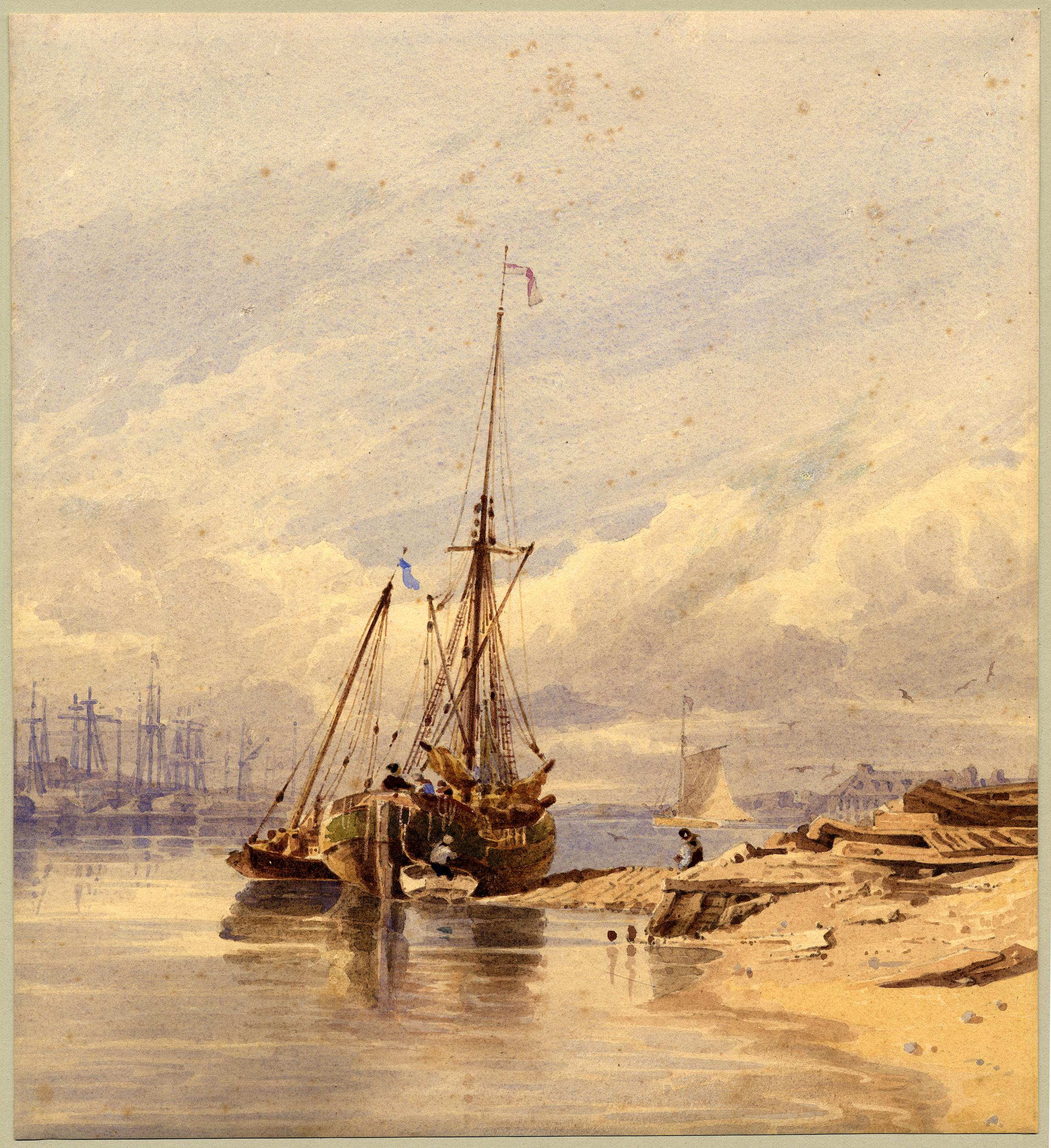
The River Yare at Gorleston, with shipping (undated), British Museum

The art historian Marjorie Allthorpe-Guyton charted Thirtle's development as an artist into four periods. During the first period, c.1803 – 1808, he produced few works, and his style fluctuated; the following period from 1808 to 1813 is marked by the strong influence of Cotman. During his third period, from 1813 to 1819, when his article style returned to being more conventional and less realistic, he produced outdoors what the art historian Andrew Hemingway has described as "wonderfully spontaneous and sure sketches". After 1819 he produced few works.

Thirtle's earliest known work is his landscape The Windmill (1800), an unusual subject matter for him, as he first exhibited works that were not landscapes, but portraits and paintings of other subjects. By 1806 he had begun to increase his output of landscapes, and to stand out as a master of the genre of watercolour painting. In 1803, Crome and Robert Ladbrooke formed the Norwich Society of Artists, which included Vincent, Charles Hodgson, Daniel Coppin, James Stark and Robert Dixon. Their first exhibition, in 1805, marked the start of the Norwich School of painters, the first British art movement created outside London. Thirtle exhibited five paintings as one of the five featured artists.

Thirtle was a major figure within the Norwich School of painters. He was probably a founding member of the Norwich Society of Artists, but his membership of the society was only first recorded three years after it was founded. He exhibited during the first years of the society, showing only miniatures. After he became a landscape artist, depicting scenes of thunderstorms and the rivers Yare and Wensum, the nature of his exhibited works changed. Crome, Cotman and Thirtle were sources of inspiration for the artists of the Norwich School. Thirtle served as vice-president of the society from 1806 to 1812. His output of exhibited works declined from a peak of 17 (produced in 1806) until he exhibited only six works in 1817, and none the year after that, making a total of 97. He exhibited only once outside Norwich, at the Royal Academy in London in 1808. His business responsibilities prevented him from working as a full-time artist, and he abandoned painting during his final illness.

==== Marriage ====
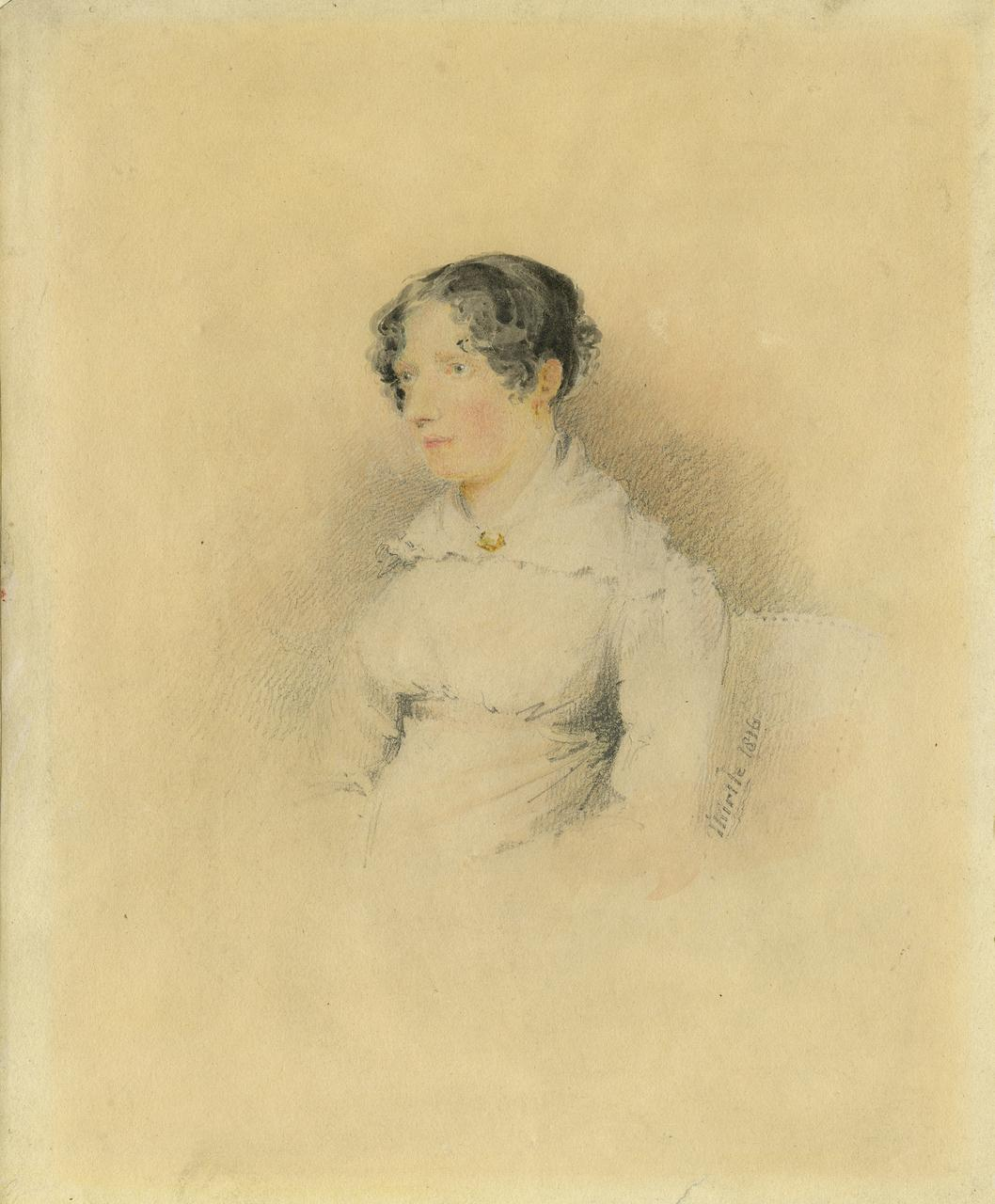
Portrait of the Artist's wife, Elizabeth Miles (1816), Norfolk Museums Collections

On 26 October 1812 Thirtle married Elizabeth Miles of Felbrigg, from a minor landowning family in north Norfolk; her sister Ann had married Cotman three years previously. Thirtle and Elizabeth were married at St Saviour's, the church in Norwich where he had been baptised 35 years previously. The marriage produced a close association with Cotman that influenced Thirtle's artistic style. The two artists probably worked together when Cotman was producing drawings of the interior of Norwich Cathedral in around 1808, as similar drawings by Thirtle from this time have survived. The two Miles sisters were themselves amateur painters, having shown their work at the Norwich Society of Artists exhibition of 1811. The marriage was probably childless.

==== Secession from the Norwich Society of Artists ====
In 1814 Thirtle was elected President of the Norwich Society of Artists, but he was one of three leading artists to secede from the Society in 1816 to form the Norfolk and Norwich Society of Artists. The secession was caused by a disagreement over how the profits of the exhibitions should be used. It led to Ladbrooke, Sillett, Joseph Clover, Stannard and Thirtle renting part of the Shakespeare Tavern on Theatre Plain and holding their own exhibition, The Twelfth Exhibition of the Norfolk and Norwich Society of Artists, to rival the original Society's exhibition in Sir Benjamin's Wrench's Court.

Thirtle's decline in output from 1806 was reported by the local press, whose disappointment was expressed in 1811: "We lament exceedingly that Mr. Thirtle, who made up the seceding triumvirate, should not have found time for a single drawing. His occupation is doubly to be regretted, because he stands highest and alone in the particular and beautiful department of watercolours in which he has evinced so much decided excellence." Although Thirtle continued to paint, he exhibited nothing from 1818 to 1828.

At some time, while Cotman was contributing drawings for the Excursions in the County of Norfolk (1818), Thirtle went to Great Yarmouth to help his brother-in-law, but none of his drawings appeared in the published work and he probably assisted Cotman by relieving him of his teaching activities.

=== Later life ===
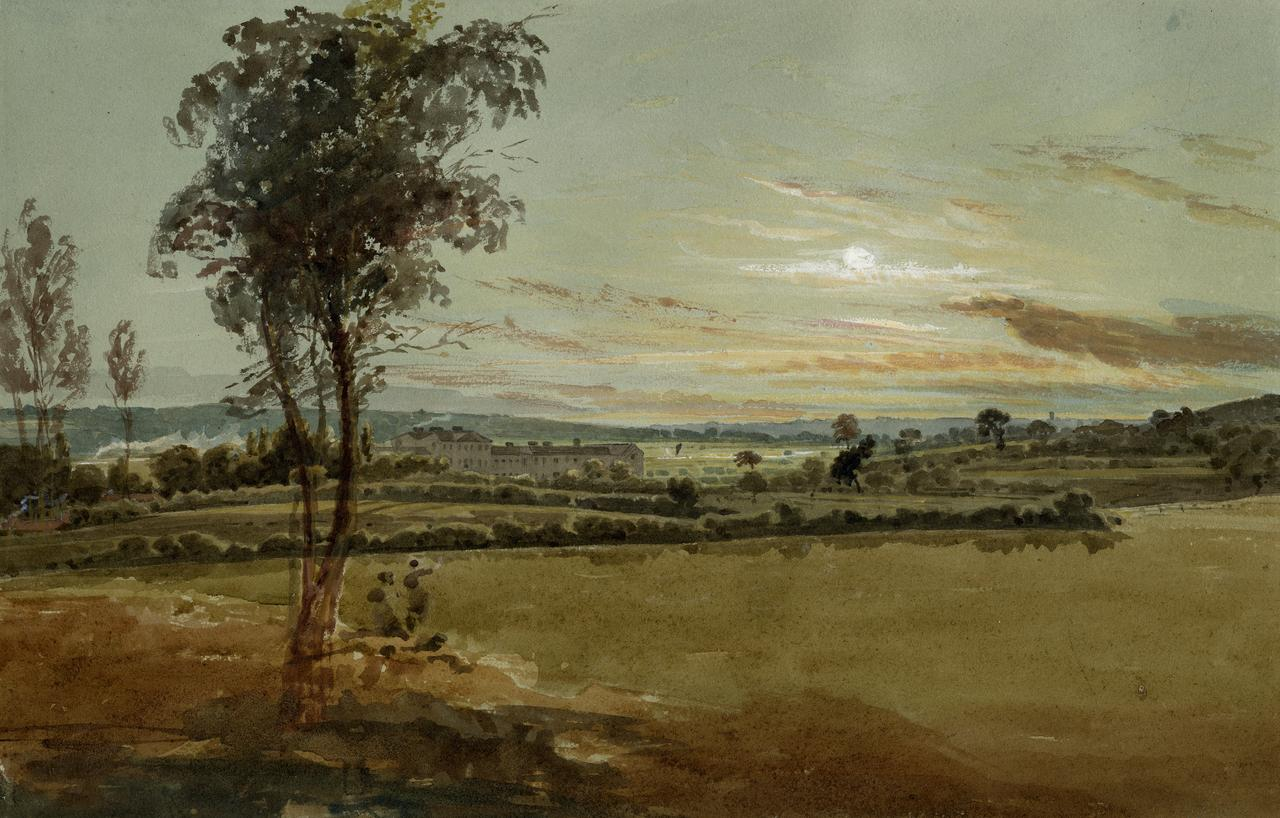
Sunset Landscape with Thorpe Hospital, Norwich (1828), Norfolk Museums Collections; a successful example of Thirtle's tendency to use tinted paper. (Note: Allthorpe-Guyton notes that "the intensity of colour and assured handling ... make it one of the most impressive of Thirtle’s late drawings".)

By 1824 Thirtle was taking on pupils: he was employed by Thomas Blofield to instruct his daughter Mary Catherine and he also taught James Pattison Cockburn. Thirtle's mother died in 1823; an inheritance from his father, who died in 1825, may have given him some financial security for the remainder of his life, as 1825 is the first year in which he is known to have independently owned property.

After the dissolution of the Norwich Society of Artists in 1833, its main artists, including Thirtle, remained active. He continued to produce picture frames as well as to paint river scenes, reminiscent of the works of Peter De Wint. His drawings and paintings were collected by Lound, a prolific water colourist and etcher who owned 70 of Thirtle's works at the time of his own death in 1861. Lound's etching of Devil's Tower – Looking towards Carrow Bridge (1832) created a rendition of Thirtle's original watercolour "that perfectly convey the tonal balance that Thirtle had established".

Thirtle is known to have suffered from tuberculosis for many years. This greatly interfered with his work output, although the art historian Derek Clifford has commented on the stronger and more freely expressed manner of these later drawings. Thirtle died of tuberculosis in Norwich on 30 September 1839, and was buried in the Rosary Cemetery in Norwich. The tomb-chest of Thirtle and his wife can be found in Section E (Reference E759 Sq(uare)). After his death, the framing business was taken over by William Boswell. In Thirtle's short will, made in 1838 and proved in December 1839, he described himself as both a carver and a gilder. He left the sum of £2,000 (equivalent to £247,110 in 2024) to his wife Elizabeth. She outlived him by many years, dying in 1882 at the age of 95.

== Style and technique ==
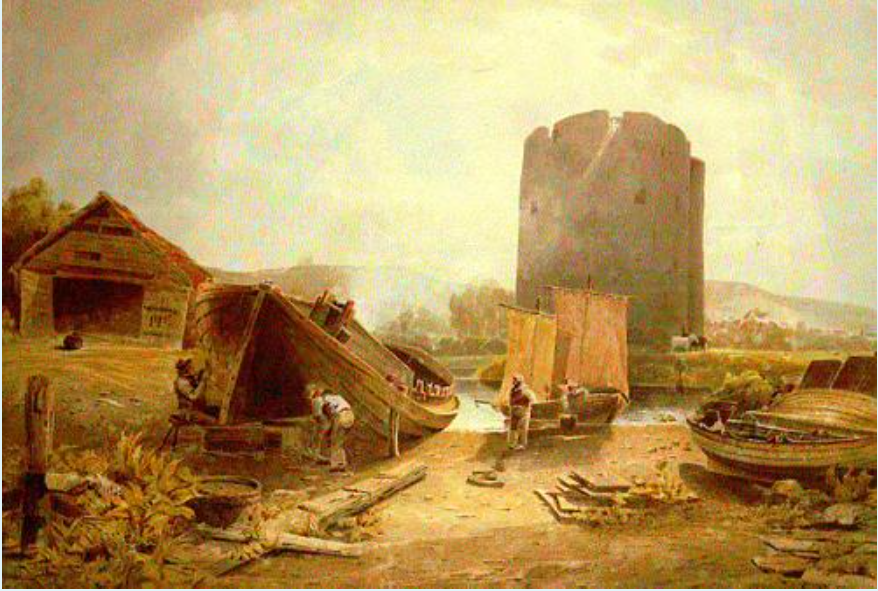
Boat Builder's Yard, near the Cow's Tower, Norwich (1812), Norfolk Museums Collections

John Thirtle exhibited 79 works in Norwich, the majority of which were of the city or the Norfolk countryside. His style was influenced by the English watercolourist Thomas Girtin, as well as fellow members of the Norwich School, such as Crome and Cotman. Thirtle responded to Cotman by producing works that were technically accomplished. Walpole notes that they were produced by "a very independent spirit, answerable to no-one". The artist Henry Ladbrooke, who was a contemporary of Thirtle's, wrote: "As a man of genius, Cotman was much Crome's superior and, as a colourist, Thirtle far surpassed them both." Thirtle's watercolours can easily be distinguished from those of Cotman and only occasionally show his influence, as with his undated watercolour Old Waterside Cottage, Norwich; he typically did not use the kind of flat washes that Cotman used regularly. The large finished drawing The Boatyard, near The Cow Tower, Norwich (1812) is independent of Cotman's influence and has more naturalism, as it relies to a greater extent on carefully observed light effects.

Although Thirtle attempted to paint in oils, he is known for his watercolours. The Times, announcing an exhibition of works by lesser known members of the Norwich School in July 1886, described him as "a good portrait painter and a charming landscapist in watercolour, his drawings being full of observation and treated with a freedom, breadth and delicacy that are really remarkable". He surpassed both Crome and Cotman as a watercolourist of outdoor phenomena. His earlier landscapes, from 1808 to 1813, were painted mainly with a restricted range of buffs, blues and grey-browns, as exemplified by Interior of Binham Abbey (1808), now in the Ashmolean Museum, Oxford.

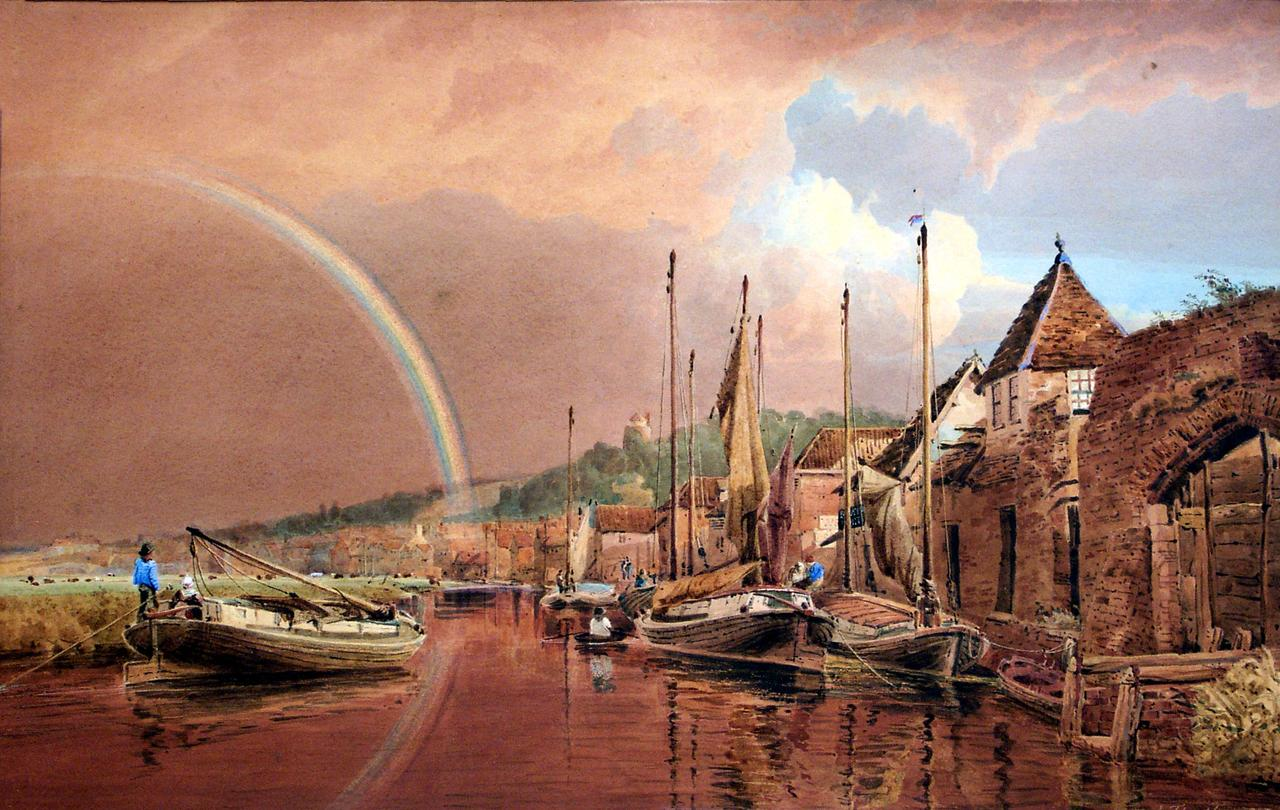
Rainbow Effect on the River, King Street, Norwich (1817), Norfolk Museums Collections (Note: Thirtle was praised by the Norwich Mercury when this painting was exhibited in 1817: "The Scene on the King Street River is a singular and beautiful Drawing, the gleam of light over the meadow beyond the Rainbow, is well executed, and has a very pleasing effect.")

With his later paintings (produced during the period 1814–1819) he reached his peak, and according to the art historian Margorie Allthorpe-Guyton, his scenes were painted with "limpid, silvery tonality and broad assured washes". He went on to paint with greater brilliancy of colour, producing works that included angular block forms. Clifford praised Thirtle's ability to organise his subjects harmoniously in an unforced and unselfconscious way, but noted how he was less able than Crome to "give the impression of an unaffected, unselected chunk of nature". Hemingway, who describes Thirtle as "an outstanding if variable" watercolour artist to be ranked alongside De Wint and Joshua Cristall, describes Thirtle's ability to create the feeling of space as "exceptional". His pictures of riverside landscapes of Norfolk have a trait that was peculiar to his style—a boat gliding along on the water from the left.

Thirtle's Manuscript Treatise on Watercolour, written no earlier than 1810, (Note: Thirtle's title at the beginning of the manuscript reads Hints on Water-Colour Painting by John Thirtle Artist.) is now in the Norwich Castle Museum. It was more a reference manual for his own use than a means of perpetuating his ideas for the future. Nothing written by Thirtle other than his Treatise is known to have survived. The treatise is an important document for art historians that provides documentary evidence of Thirtle's approach to his work as an artist. Allthorpe-Guyton dates it to no earlier than 1810, referring to pigments introduced early in the 19th century, such as purple and brown madder. It consists of an unorganised collection of technical instructions and observations, possibly made from paraphrases of published works such as Ackermann's New Drawing Book (1809). Thirtle's list of pigments is longer than Ackermann's and that given by William Henry Pyne, in his Rudiments of Landscape Drawing (1812). Both Pyne and Thirtle describe the use of indigo and provide schemes for colouring skies, buildings and trees. In the treatise, Thirtle shows his interest in depicting the weather, and his opposition towards contemporary ideas of painting in a picturesque way. It contains what Hemingway describes as "undertones of a classical aesthetic", also to be found in John Berney Crome's lecture Painting and Poetry.

=== Use of indigo ===
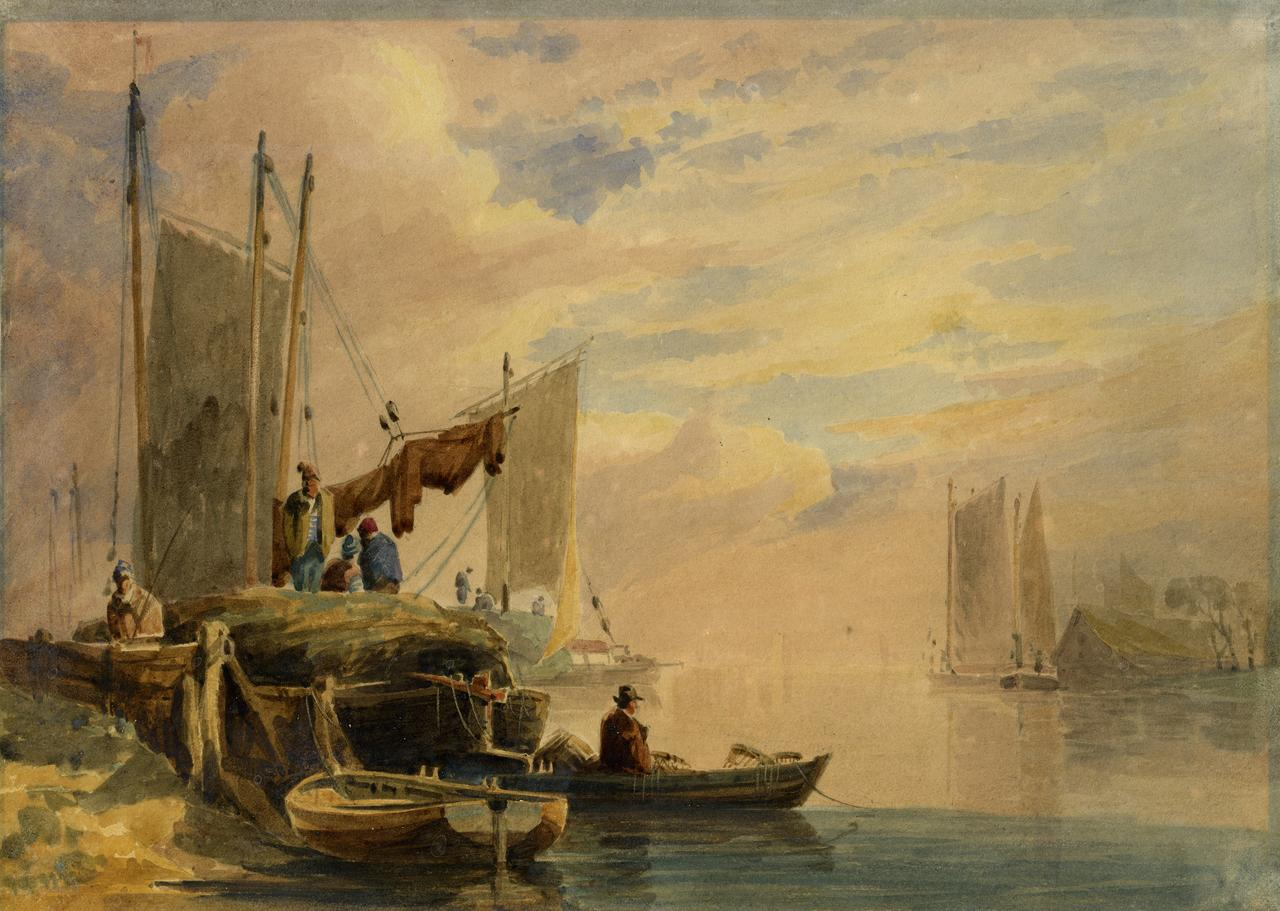
River Scene with laden Wherries and Figures (undated), Norfolk Museums Collections

Thirtle used a natural indigo pigment for producing fine greys, obtained from indigofera tinctoria, a species of the bean family. (Note: Writing in the 1890s, the British chemist Arthur Herbert Church noted in The Chemistry of Paints and Painting: "Indian red ... was extensively employed by the older masters of the English Water-Colour School, in association with true ultramarine, with Prussian blue, with indigo, or with indigo and yellow ochre, to produce the lilac greys of stormy clouds. The indigo in some of these greys having often perished, the Indian red (and the yellow ochre where employed) remains intact, giving a hot and frequently foxy red to spaces which were originally cool in hue, and comparatively neutral.") He may have used a cheap form of indigo sold by a local dealer in Norwich. Those watercolours where the pigment was used have deteriorated because the pigment faded to red when exposed to light. This characteristic of his paintings cannot be applied to them all, but it is sometimes assumed that Thirtle's works are all permanently ruined in this way. Equally, the use of indigo by other painters has meant that their works were sometimes incorrectly attributed to Thirtle.

An example of such a work is his River Scene with laden Wherries and Figures, an undated pencil and watercolour, in which the pink glow of the sky and the sea have been unintentionally caused by the fading away of the original greyish blue colours. The original colours produced by Thirtle can still be seen around the edges of the painting, where there was much less exposure to light. A section in Thirtle's treatise describes how he used indigo when painting his skies, without any mention of its fading effect:

Occasionally you may use Black on the sky, do it with care or you will make it earthy—Venetian Red and Indigo, the red predominating, will do for the first wash of your clouds, as it will appear warm. Let your next shadow have more Indigo, making a Grey. The third, make the Maddar Purple and Indigo, you'll have a fine tone in the clouds.

— John Thirtle, Manuscript Treatise on Watercolour.

== Legacy ==
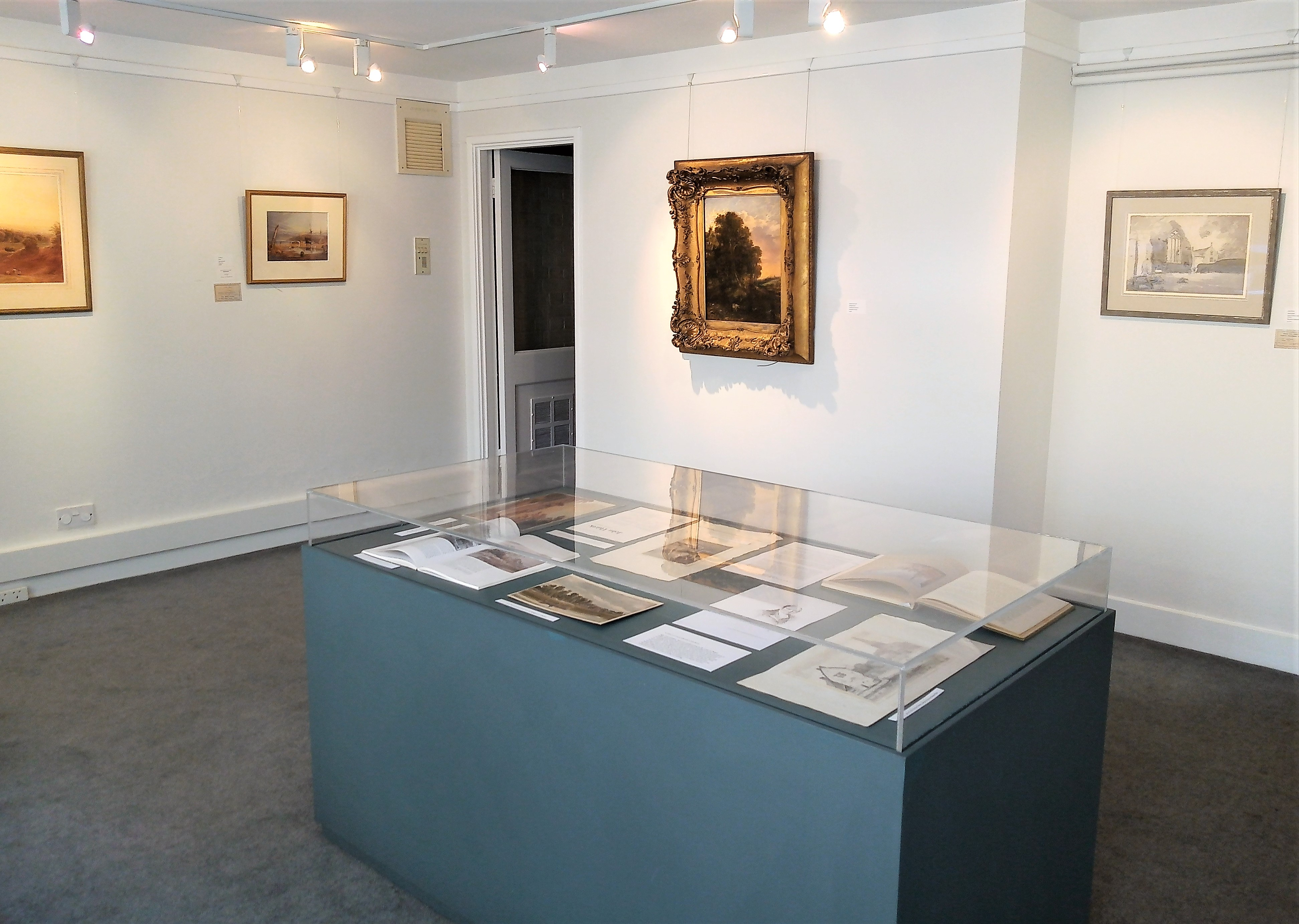
An exhibition of John Thirtle's works in Mandell's Gallery, Norwich, in 2022

Thirtle was praised in the local press for his work, but was criticised for not exhibiting his works more regularly. During the second half of the 19th century, he lapsed into obscurity, which Allthorpe-Guyton attributes to his lack of success in becoming better known outside Norwich.

An exhibition of Thirtle's paintings was first held by the Norwich Art Circle in 1886. To celebrate the centenary of his death, some of his works were shown in an exhibition in Norwich Castle in 1939, but it was forced to close because of the outset of the Second World War.

A biennial show of paintings by Thirtle and his contemporaries was held in Norwich Castle in 1977; his treatise on watercolour painting was published for the first time in the accompanying exhibition catalogue.

== Gallery ==
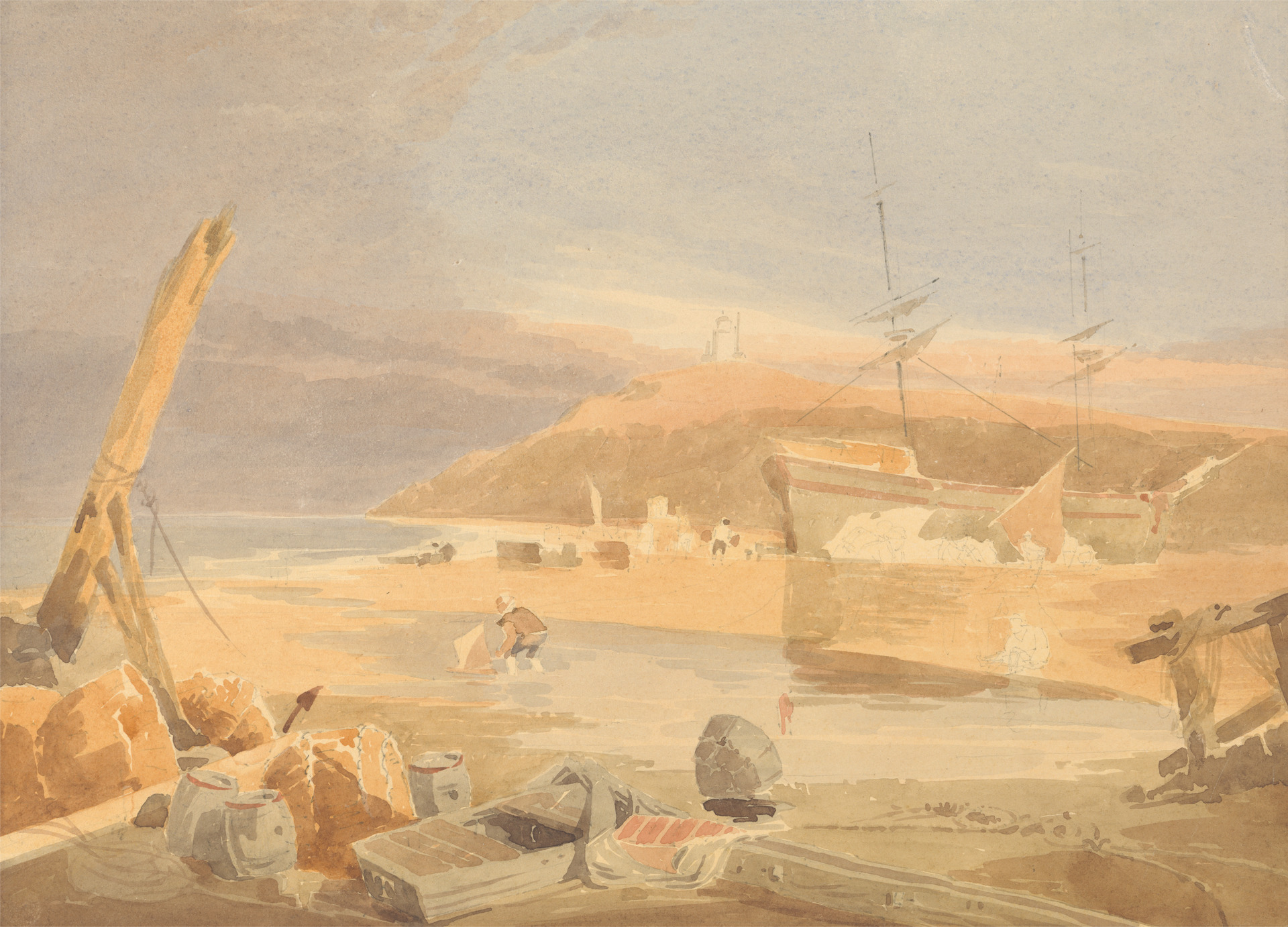
Shore Scene with Sailing Ship at Quay (undated), Yale Center for British Art

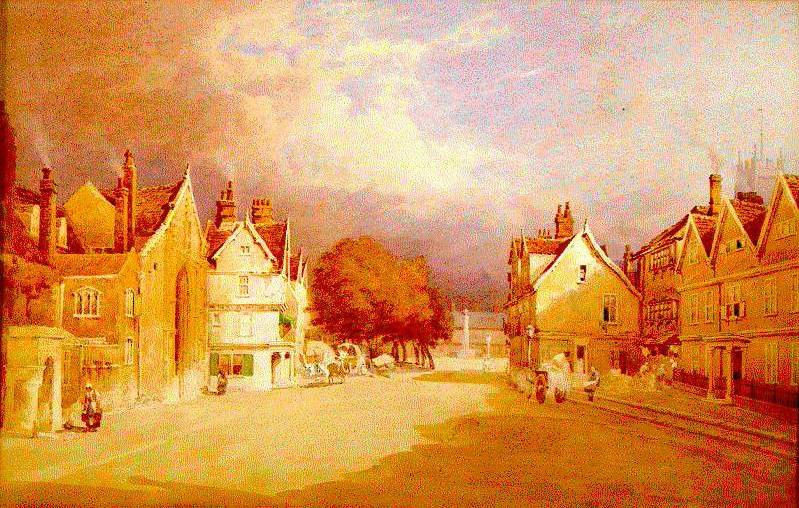
Tombland, Norwich (1830), Norfolk Museums Collections

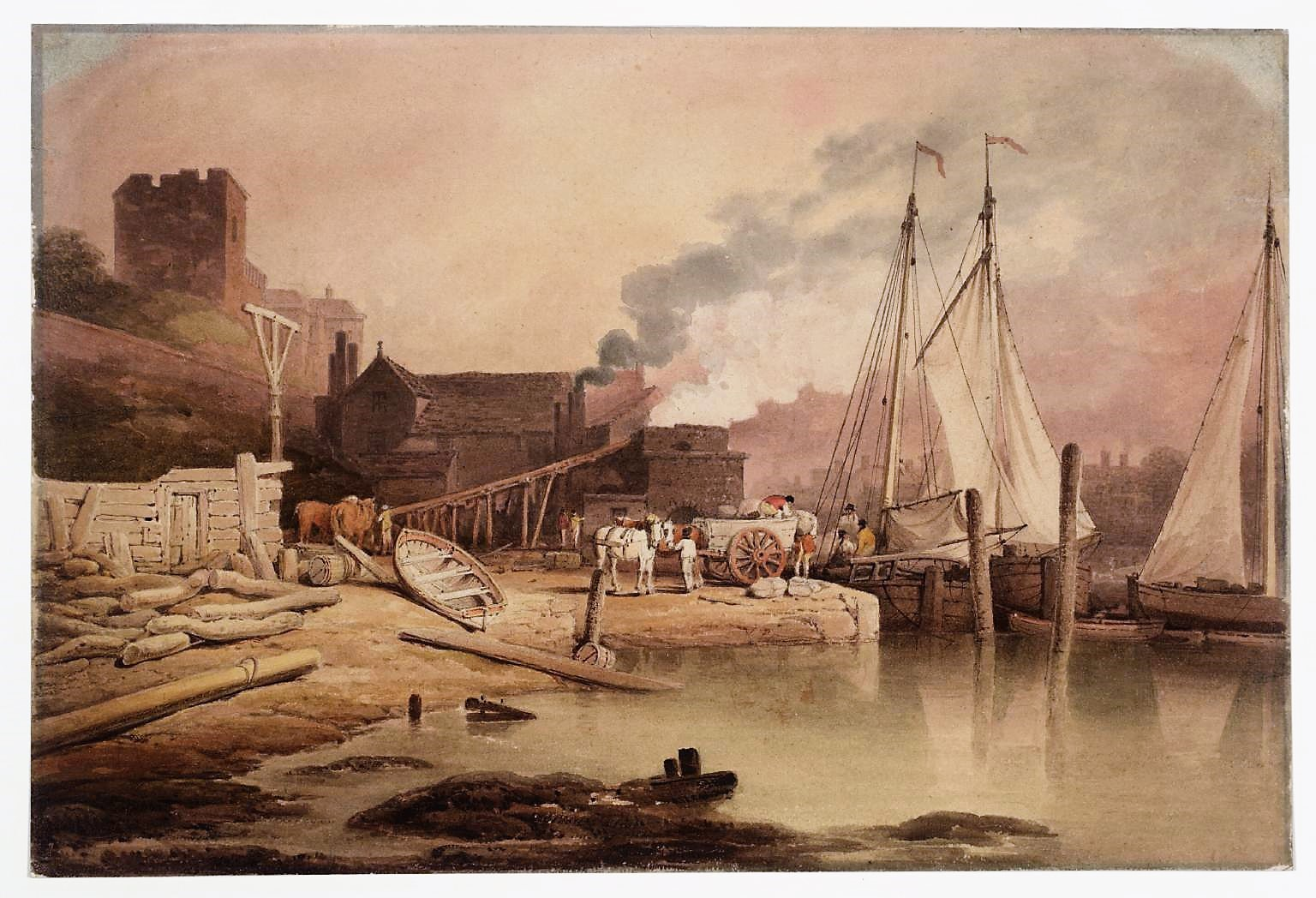
Old Lynn (undated), Tate Britain

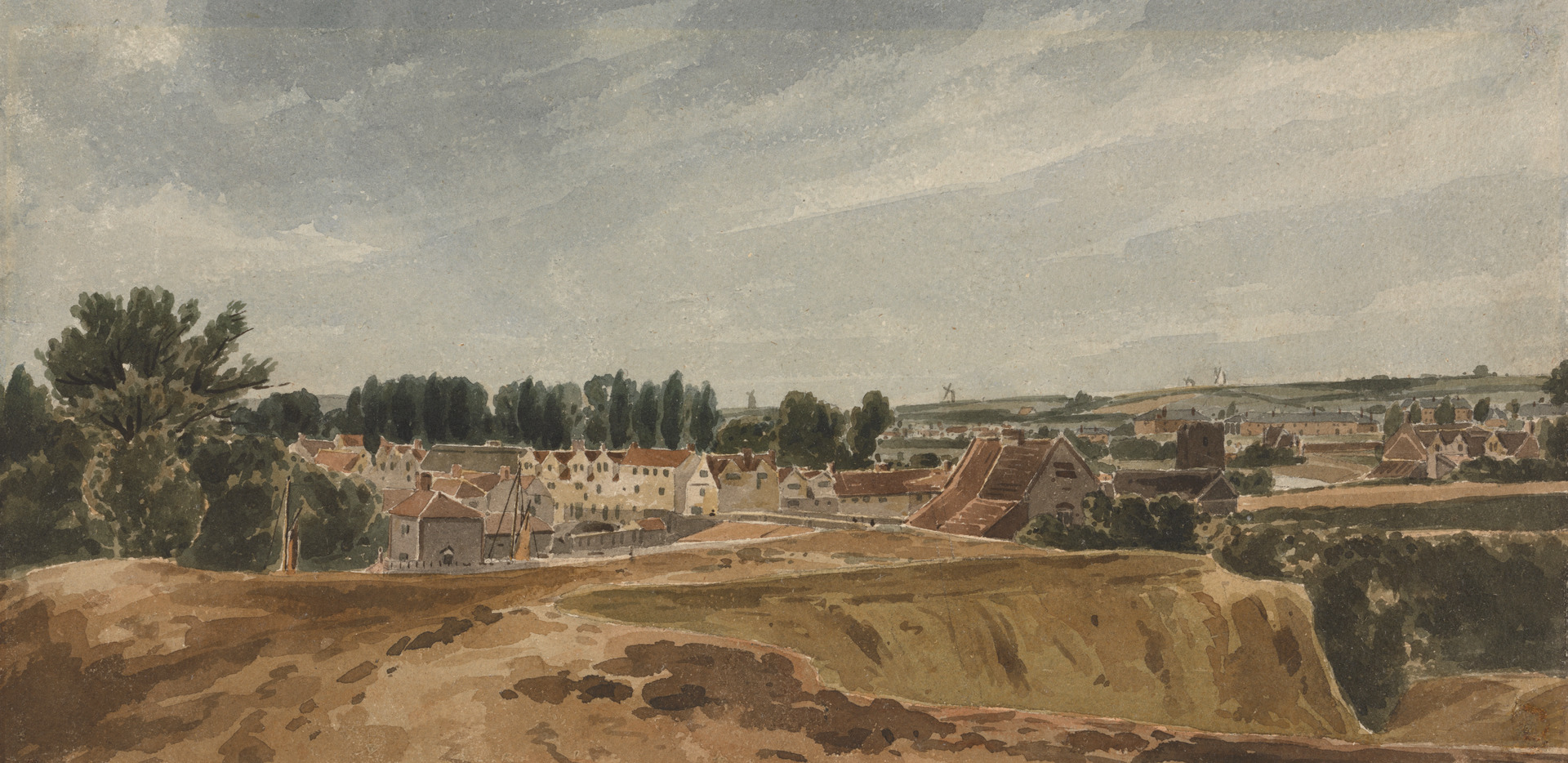
View near Bishopsgate Bridge with Cow Tower, looking towards Mousehold (1816), Yale Center for British Art

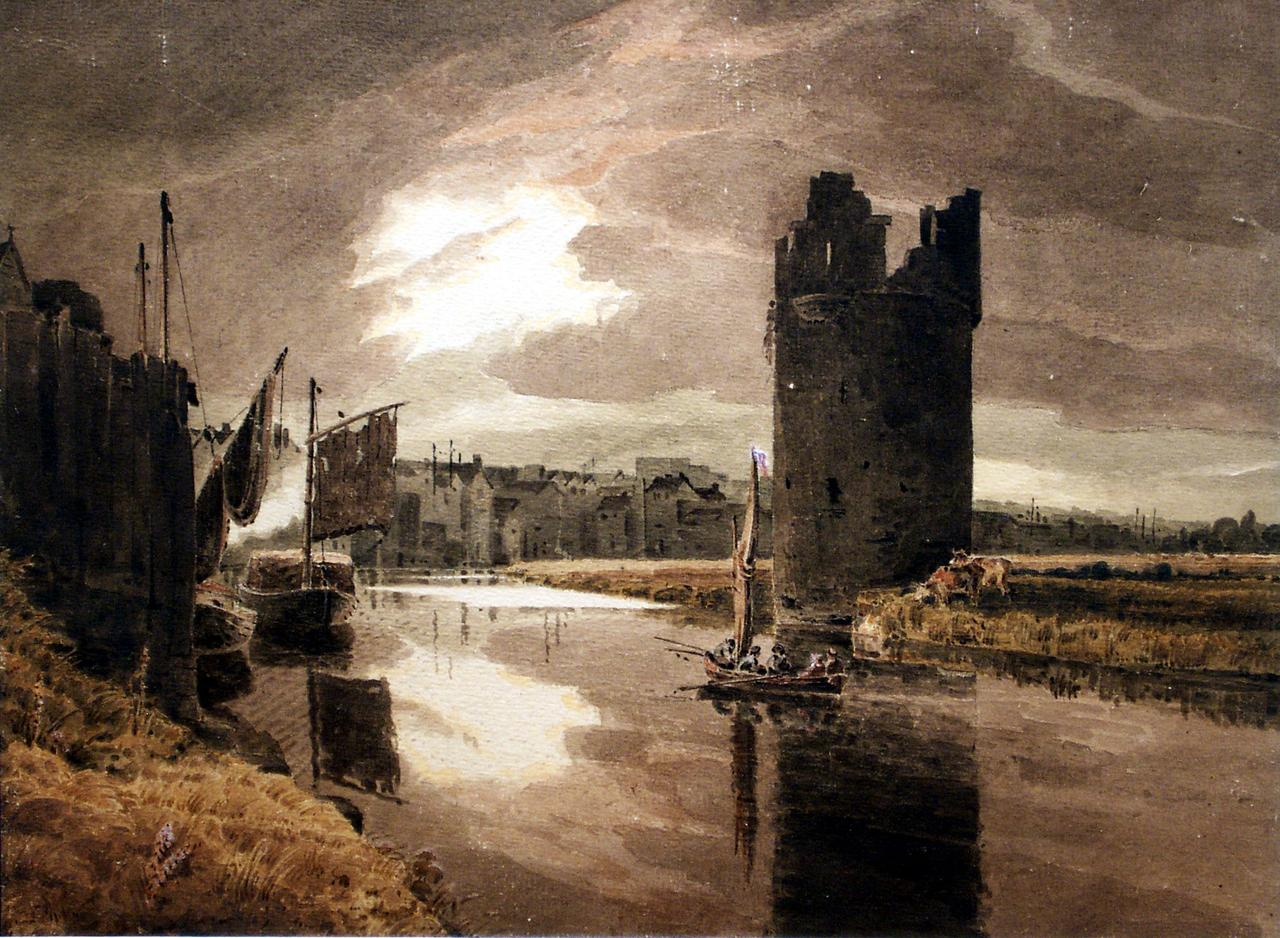
The Devil's Tower near King Street Gates – Evening (undated), Norfolk Museums Collections (Note: This faded watercolour depicts one of Norwich's two medieval boom towers across the River Wensum, possibly made c.1809. Thirtle painted the tower on five different occasions.)

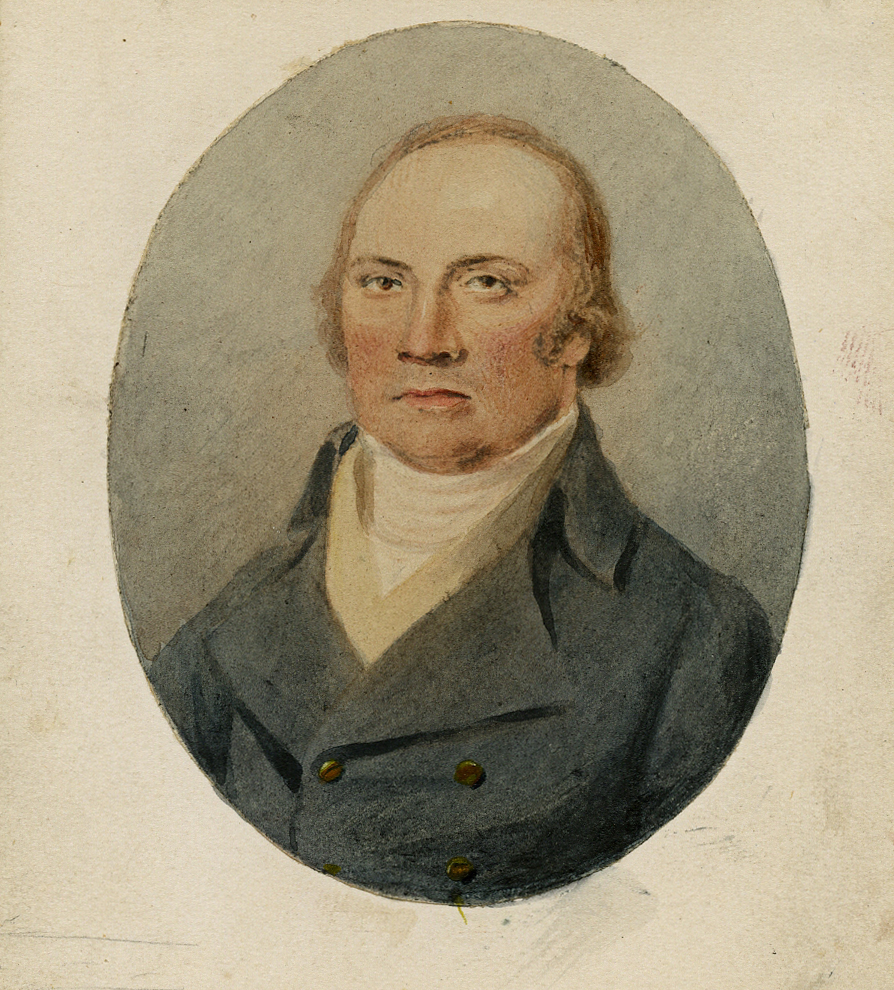
Portrait of James Thirtle (attributed, undated), Norfolk Museums Collections

== Sources ==
- Allthorpe-Guyton, Marjorie (1977). John Thirtle, 1777–1839: Drawings in Norwich Castle Museum. London: Norfolk Museums Service. ISBN 978-0-903101-23-3.
- Beard, Geoffrey; Gilbert, Christopher, eds. (1986). Dictionary of English Furniture Makers 1660–1840. Leeds – via British History Online.
- Church, Arthur Herbert (1890). The Chemistry of Paints and Painting. London: Seeley & Co. OCLC 1147806133.
- Clifford, Derek Plint (1965). Watercolours of the Norwich School. London: Cory, Adams & Mackay. OCLC 1624701.
- Cundall, Herbert Minton (1920). The Norwich School. London: Geoffrey Holme Ltd. OCLC 472125860.
- Dickes, William Frederick (1906). The Norwich School of Painting: being a full account of the Norwich exhibitions, the lives of the painters, the lists of their respective exhibits, and descriptions of the pictures. London; Norwich: Jarrold & Sons Ltd. OCLC 192940599.
- Fawcett, Trevor (1978). "Eighteenth-Century Art in Norwich". The Volume of the Walpole Society. 46. London: Pitman Press: 71–90. ISSN 0141-0016. JSTOR i40086427.
- Hamlin, Philip Edward (1986). Rosary Cemetery: Monumental Inscriptions 1819–1986 & Burials 1821–1837. Norfolk Genealogy. Vol. 18. Norwich: Norfolk & Norwich Genealogical Society. OCLC 16517725.
- Hardie, Martin (1966). Water-colour Painting in Britain: The Romantic Period. Vol. II. London: B.T. Batsford Ltd. ISBN 978-0-7134-0717-4. (registration required)
- Hemingway, Andrew (1977). "John Thirtle at Norwich". The Burlington Magazine. 119 (893): 588–591. ISSN 0007-6287. JSTOR 878848.
- Kitson, Sydney D. (1982). The Life of John Sell Cotman. London: Rodart Reproductions Ltd. ISBN 978-0-9503307-1-6.
- Moore, Andrew W. (1985). The Norwich School of Artists. Her Majesty's Stationery Office & Norwich Museums Service. ISBN 978-0-11-495239-6.
- Scott, Peter Kennedy (1998). A Romantic Look at Norwich School Landscapes. Ipswich: Acer Art Publishing. ISBN 978-0-9534711-1-9.
- Searle, Geoffrey R. (2015). Etchings of the Norwich School. Norwich: Lasse Press. ISBN 978-0-9568758-9-1.
- Walpole, Josephine (1997). Art and Artists of the Norwich School. Woodbridge: Antique Collectors' Club. ISBN 978-0-9559320-4-5.
