= Mary Newcomb (artist) =

British artist

Mary Newcomb (25 January 1922 – 29 March 2008) was a British artist.

She was born Mary Slatford at Harrow-on-the-Hill on 25 January 1922. She studied Natural Sciences at Reading University.

Her work is in the permanent collection of the Tate Gallery.
