= Arthur James Stark =

English painter

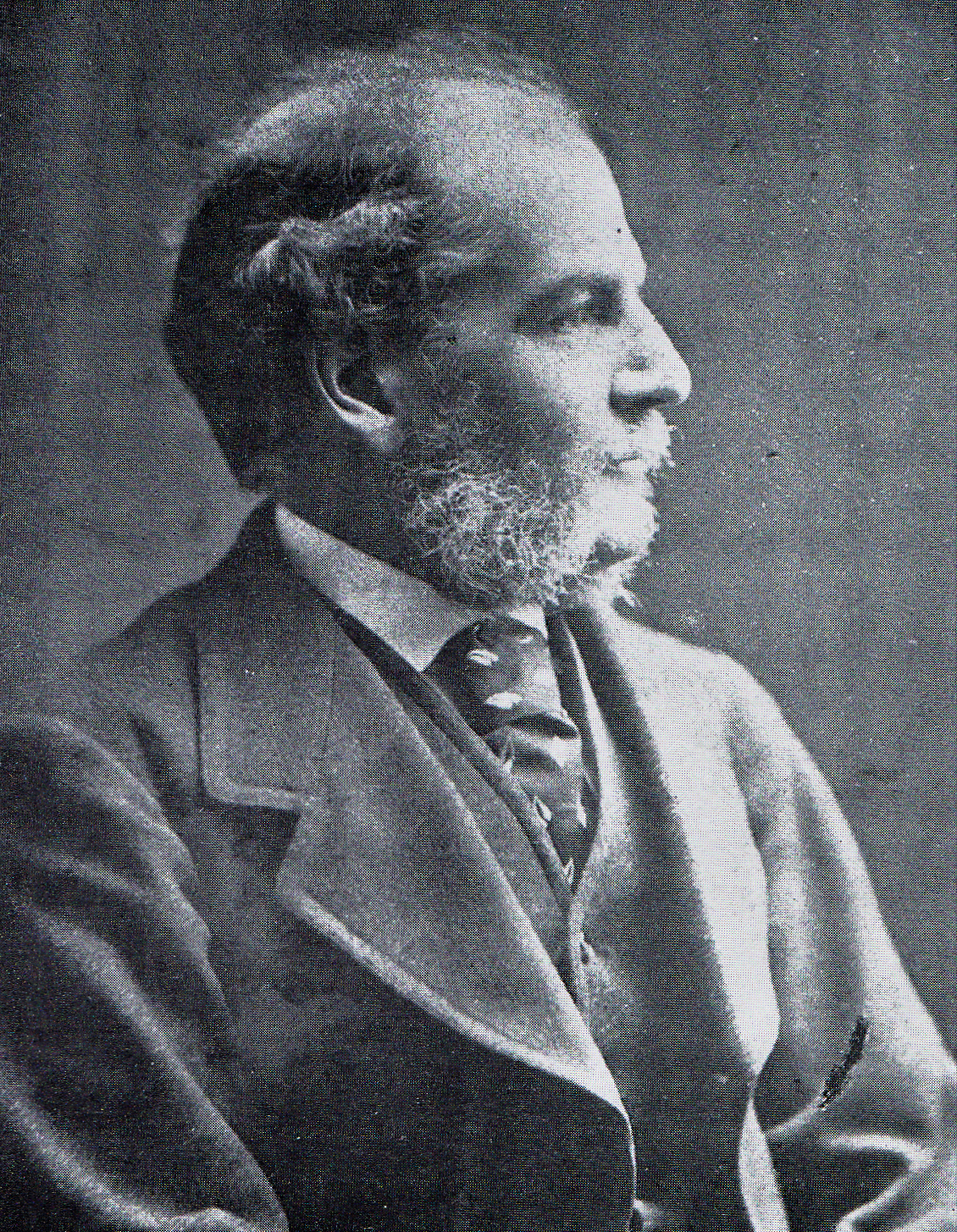
- Born: 6 October 1831; Chelsea, London
- Died: 29 October 1902 (aged 71); Nutfield, Surrey
- Education: James Stark
- Known for: Landscape painting
- Movement: Norwich School of painters

Arthur James Stark (6 October 1831 – 29 October 1902) was an English painter and a member of the Norwich School of painters.

== Biography ==
Arthur James Stark was born in Beaufort Row, Chelsea on 6 October 1831, the only son of James Stark, the landscape painter, by his wife Elizabeth Young Dinmore. He was christened at St Luke's Church, Chelsea, on 2 November 1831. An artistic aptitude was early fostered by lessons from his father, with whom he was close to all his life. Between 1839 and 1849, when the family was residing at Windsor, young Stark studied animal painting under Edmund Bristow, an intimate friend of the family, and acquired a love of the Thames valley, where he found the subjects of many of his pictures. As early as 1848 he exhibited at the Royal Academy and the British Institution, his first picture at the Academy being hung on the line between works by Edwin Landseer and Sir Francis Grant.

In 1849 James Stark relocated to London for the sake of the education of his son, who entered the Royal Academy schools in the same year. During that time the family lived at 34, Norfolk Street. For some time young Stark used to paint in the stables of Messrs. Chaplin & Home, the carriers, and at a later period he rented for three years at Tatter- sail's a studio where he perfected his painting of horses. His ability became known, and in 1874, from a fear of hampering his progress, he declined a private offer of the post vacated by the death of Frederick William Keyl, an animal painter to Queen Victoria. For many years he taught art in London as well as painted. In 1886, he retired to Nutfield, Surrey, where he devoted the remainder of his life exclusively to painting.

Stark worked until within a few days of his death at Thombank, South Nutfield, Surrey, on 29 Oct. 1902. He was cremated at Woking, and a tablet was placed to his memory in Nutfield old church. His portrait in miniature by H. B. Love (1837); in oil, as a child, by Charles Hancock, and in watercolour by his wife (1883) are in the possession of his widow. He married on 20 Nov. 1878, at Ascot, Rose Isabella youngest daughter of Thomas Fassett Kent, counsel to the chairman of committees in the House of Lords. A daughter was born in 1879 and a son, James Arthur, was born 1881, both of whom survived him.

== Style and works ==
Stark was one of the last artists of the Norwich School (of which his father was a chief disciple), and probably the only one to acquire a reputation for animal painting. The minute touch of his earlier work shows the strong influence of his father, but his later pictures display a more marked individuality and abandon many of the traditions of his father's school. He was fond of depicting homely English scenes, such as haymaking, harvesting, and the farmyard; his landscapes were largely derived from the Thames valley (especially the neighbourhood of Sonning), Surrey, and Norfolk. He painted both in oil and water-colour.

Between 1848 and 1887 he exhibited thirty-six pictures at the Royal Academy, thirty-three at the British Institution, fifty-one at the Society of British Artists, three at the Institute of Painters in Water Colours, and fifty-seven at other galleries. Among his works were A Water Mill (1848), Forest Scene (1850), Interior of a Stable (1853), A Quiet Nook (1857), A Shady Pool (1861), In Moor Park, Rickmansworth (1865), Timber Carting (1874), A Farmyard (1875), and Dartmoor Drift (1877) — the last-named was one of his best paintings.

A watercolour drawing of Calves is at the Victoria and Albert Museum; three water-colours, Interior of a Windmill (on Reigate Heath) fitted up as a Chapel, Windmill and Cottage and Heath Scene, are at the British Museum, and his oil painting Dartmoor Ponies is in the Norwich Castle Museum. Exhibitions of works by him were held at the Dudley Galleries, 169 Piccadilly, in Oct. 1907 and Oct. 1911.

== Bibliography ==
This article incorporates text from a publication now in the public domain: Lee, Sidney, ed. (1912). "Stark, Arthur James". Dictionary of National Biography (2nd supplement). London: Smith, Elder & Co.

- Day, Harold (1979). The Norwich School of Painters. Eastbourne Fine Art.
