= Alfred Priest =

British painter (1810–1850)

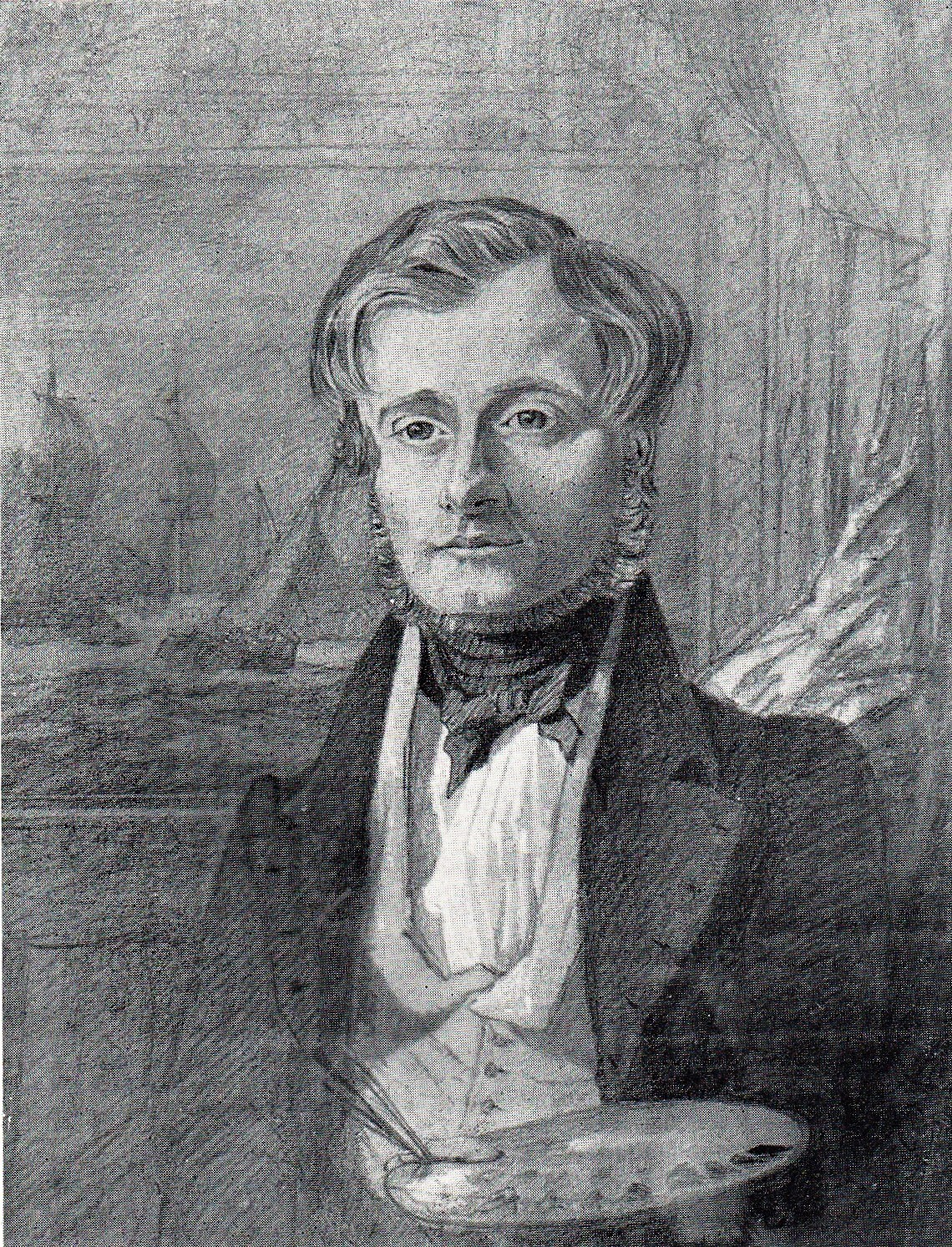
- Portrait by Miles Edmund Cotman
- Born: 12 December 1810; Norwich
- Died: 9 December 1850 (aged 39); Norwich
- Known for: Landscape painting
- Movement: Norwich School of painters

Alfred Priest (12 December 1810 – 9 December 1850) was an English painter of landscapes and marine artist, and a member of the Norwich School of painters. Born in Norwich, he was educated to follow his father in becoming a pharmacist, but he left home to work at sea, before briefly working as an apprentice surgeon.

With his family’s support, Priest then studied art in London, and was taught by James Stark and Edward William Cooke. He specialized in marine painting and rural scenes of his native Norfolk, and exhibited at the Society of British Artists and the Royal Academy. He died in Norwich of tuberculosis at the age of 39, two years after ill health forced him to return home from London.

Priest's etchings, of which around 60 are known, are in the British Museum; many of his paintings are held in the Norfolk Museums Collections. He is considered to have produced seascapes that have an authenticity not evident in all of his landscapes; his etchings, though of variable quality, are considered by modern art critics to be charming.

== Early years ==
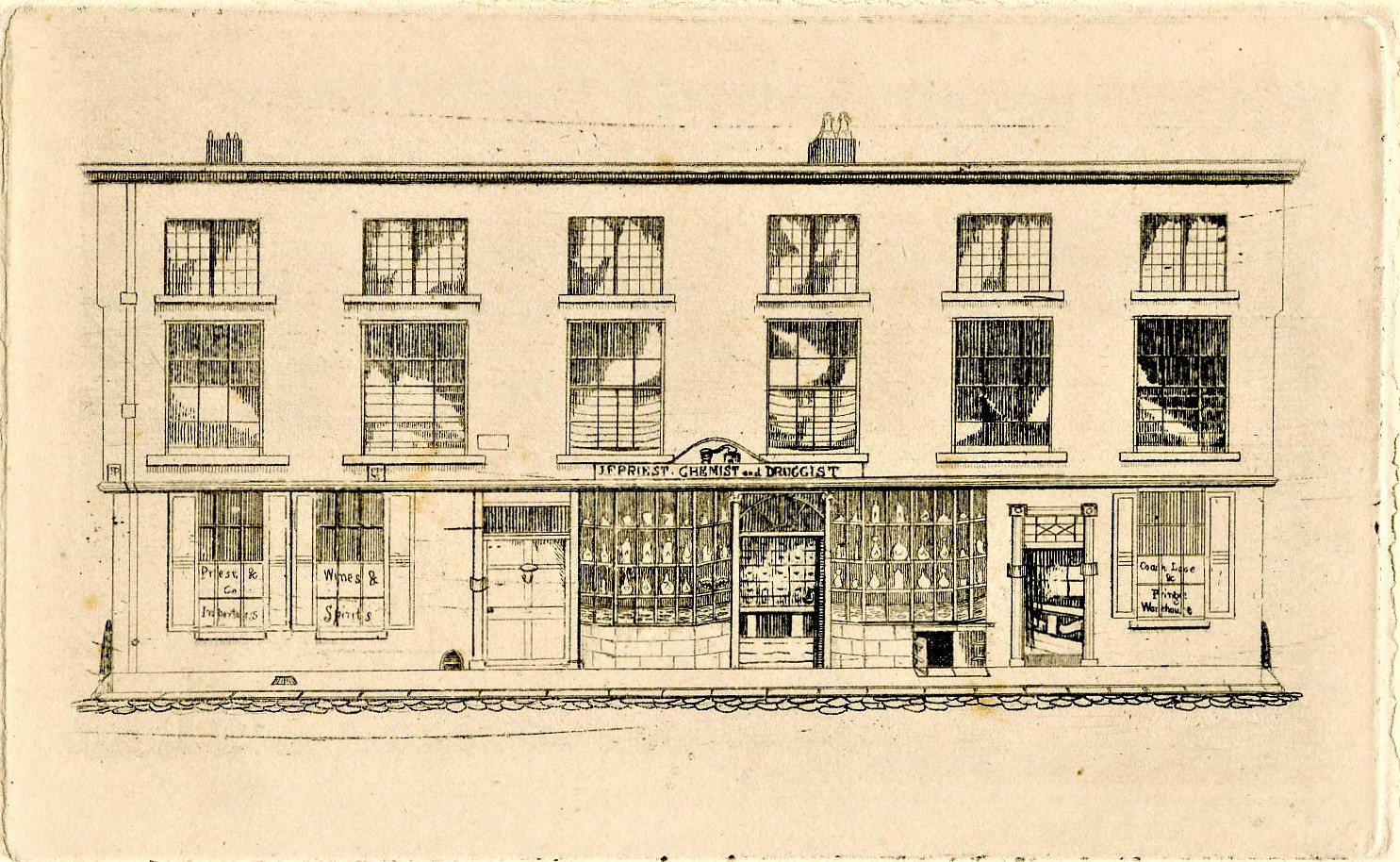
An etching by Priest of the chemist's shop on London Street, Norwich, run by his father (undated), British Museum

Alfred Priest was born in the English city of Norwich on 12 December 1810, the son of John Fox Priest and his wife Elizabeth Neal (née Raven). He was baptised at St Gregory's Church, Norwich two days later. He had at least one artistic sibling, Mary, who outlived her brother by three decades.

John Priest was a chemist, who ensured his son was educated well enough for the boy to follow in his father's profession. Following his education, and acting against his father's wishes, Priest left home. He returned to Norwich after a period at sea and then briefly worked as an apprentice to a surgeon in the Norfolk town of Downham Market.

Priest became interested in becoming an artist, and studied etching under Henry Ninham for two years. His first known original engraving was Sketch of the opening the Harbour at Lowestoft on the 9th of August 1831. He was one of several of the Norwich School artists who produced the occasional lithograph.

== Career in London ==
Priest was living in London by 1833, when he was residing at 14, Crawford Row, Chelsea. With the support of his father, Priest was a pupil of James Stark (when Stark was living in Chelsea), and Edward William Cooke, who became a close friend. Priest specialised in marine painting and is noted for his depictions of water and waves. By 1834 he was working as a portraitist. In 1835 he married, and moved to 34, Pembroke Square, Kensington.

Priest exhibited at the Society of British Artists in 1837 and 1838. His pictures were shown for the first time at the Royal Academy in 1833. He exhibited a total of 89 works between 1833 and 1847. He painted river scenes so as to demonstrate his ability to depict flowing water. The works he exhibited were Scene at Taverham, Norfolk, Water Mill, Maple Durham, near Reading and Iffley Mill, near Oxford. His choice of subject matter in his oil paintings and watercolours was shared with his close friend Miles Edmund Cotman, who visited him in Reading, and it seems that the artists worked closely together for a period. During the 1840s their styles diverged, with Priest working less meticulously than his colleague. Priest is mentioned in the correspondence of the Cotman family and the artist Edward Thomas Daniell.

Although Priest spent most of his adult life in London, most of his paintings and etchings, which were produced there, are of Norfolk scenes.

== Return to Norfolk ==
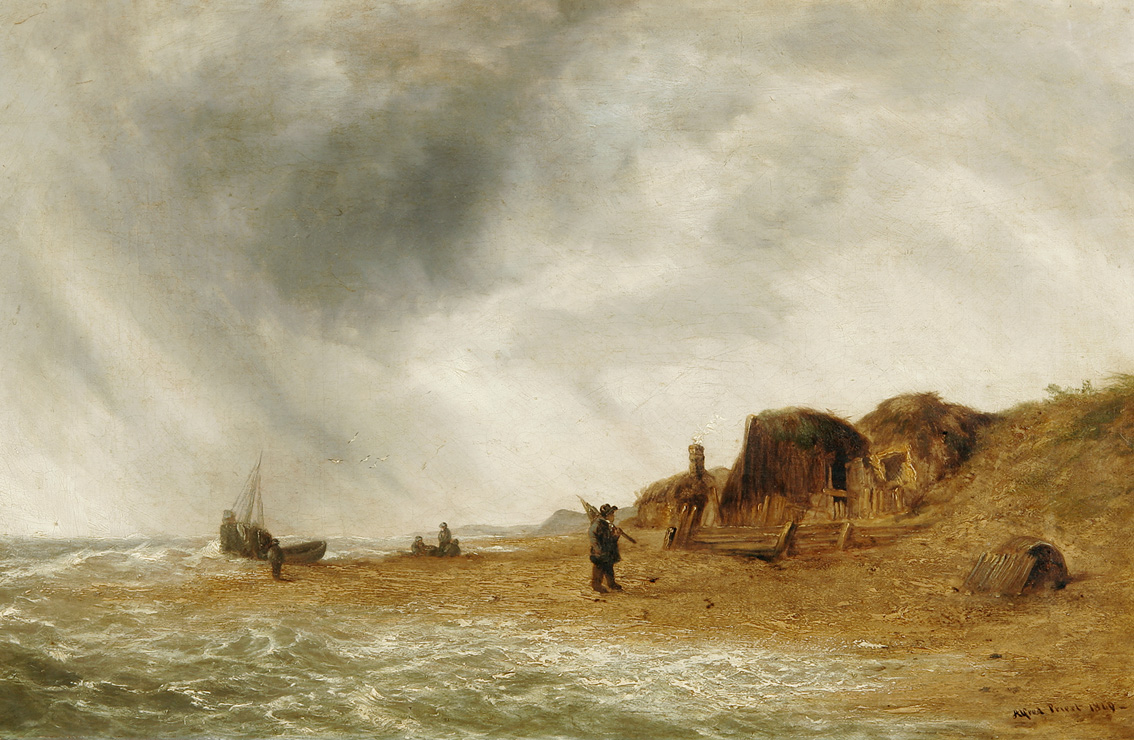
Beach Scene 1849, Norfolk Museums Collections

Ill health forced Priest to return to Norfolk in 1848, and he spent much of the following year living on the coast. He died in Norwich of tuberculosis on 9 December 1850, aged 39. (Note: A 39-year-old man from the Norwich suburb of Heigham named Alfred Priest was recorded as being buried in Cringleford, Norfolk, on 19 December 1850.) He was buried in the churchyard at Cringleford, outside Norwich.

According to the art historian William Dickes, writing in 1905, Priest "too often yielded to the sad art of fortifying himself with brandy". Priest was noted by Dickes for his fondness for children and animals, and produced a children's book, The Hare and Three Leverets, in 1848.

== Reputation and legacy ==
Priest, along with Robert Leman, Thomas Lound, Henry Bright and John Middleton, is considered by the art historian Andrew Moore to be one of the outstanding artists of the final phase of the Norwich School during the middle of the 19th century. Walpole notes that Priest was "talented to the point of facility". She considers his best works to be his seascapes, which have an authenticity lacking in some of his landscapes. that may be because of his ability to depict transparent effects. Walpole notes that Priest's landscapes make good use of warm ochres, greens and browns, but that his later paintings can be dull-looking.

Around sixty etchings by Priest are known. The British Museum hold proofs of what are probably a complete collection of Priest's etchings, which are small and of every find of subject. He also produced a few mezzotints. The art historian Josephine Walpole describes his work as "extremely competent".

== Gallery ==
=== Paintings ===
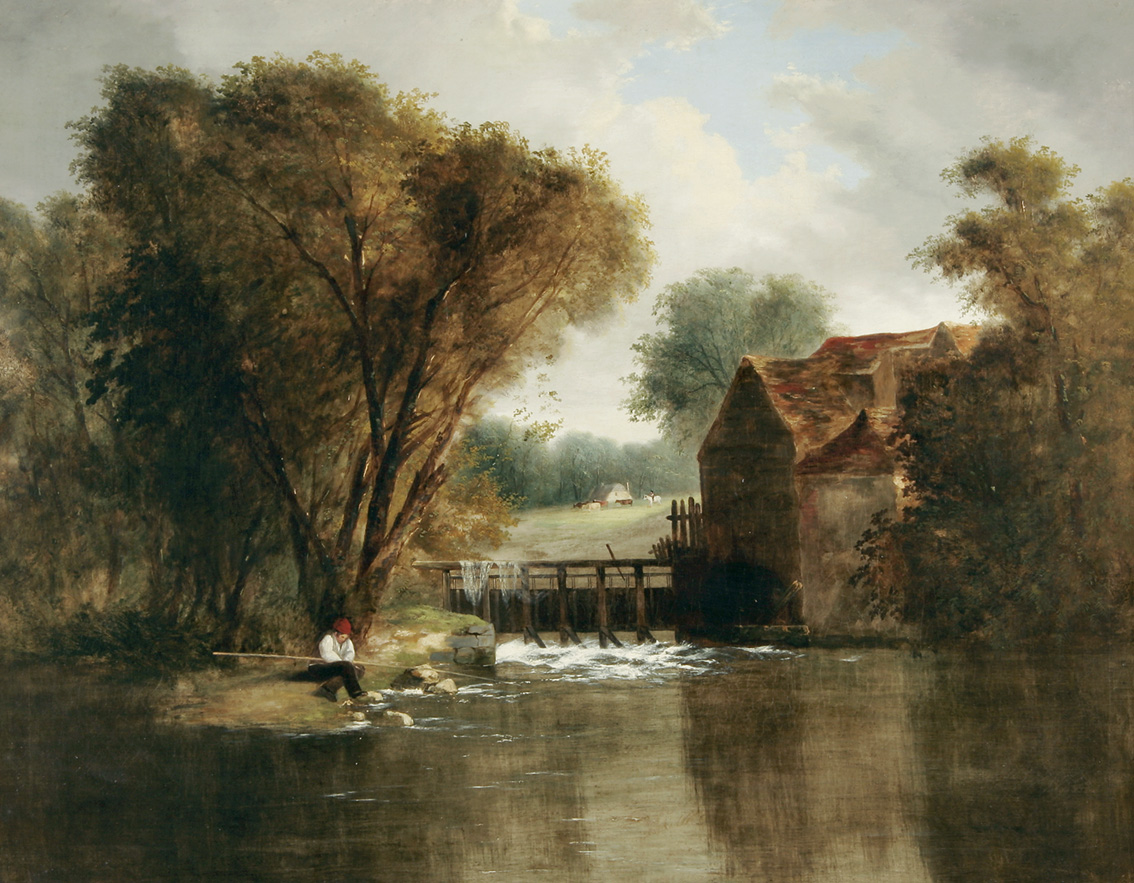
Iffley Mill, Oxford (1844), Norfolk Museums Collections

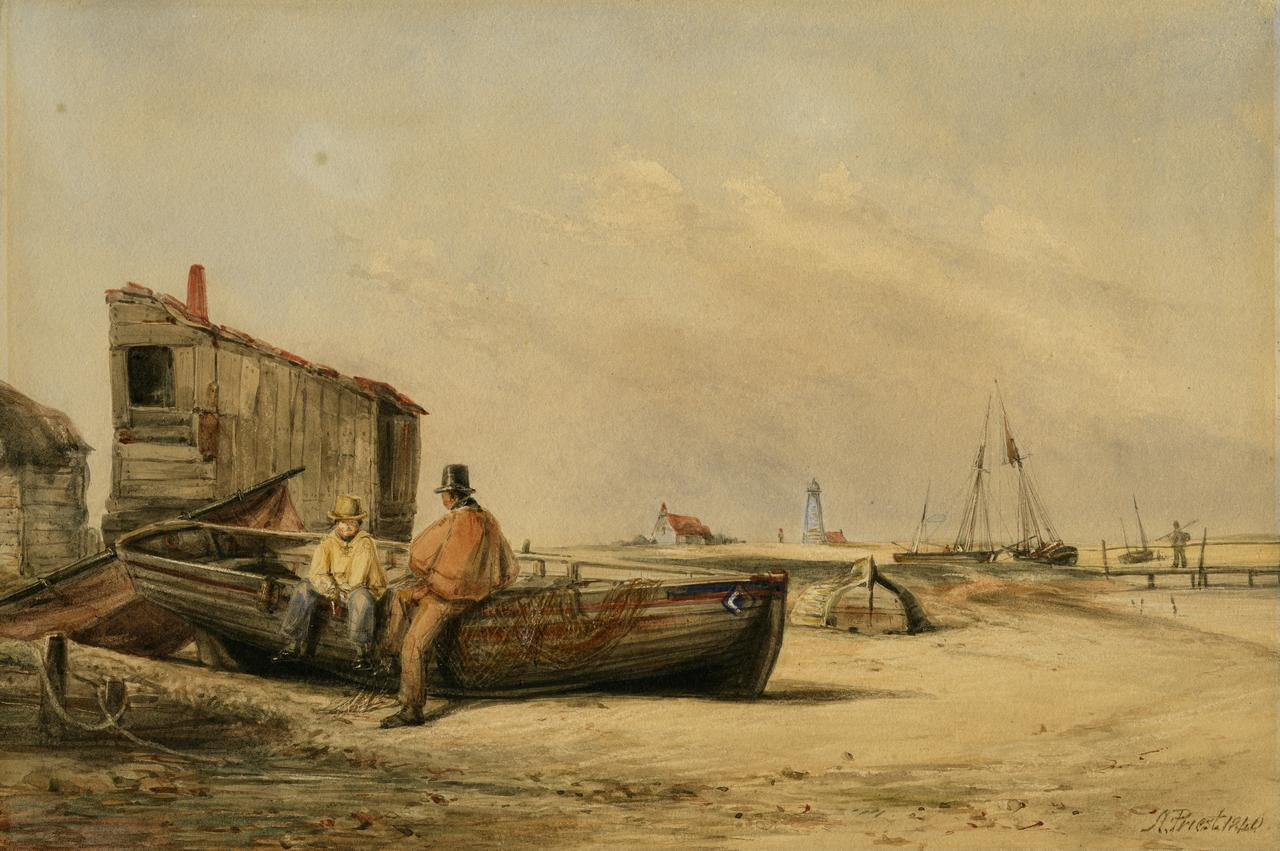
The Sands at Rye (1849), Norfolk Museums Collections

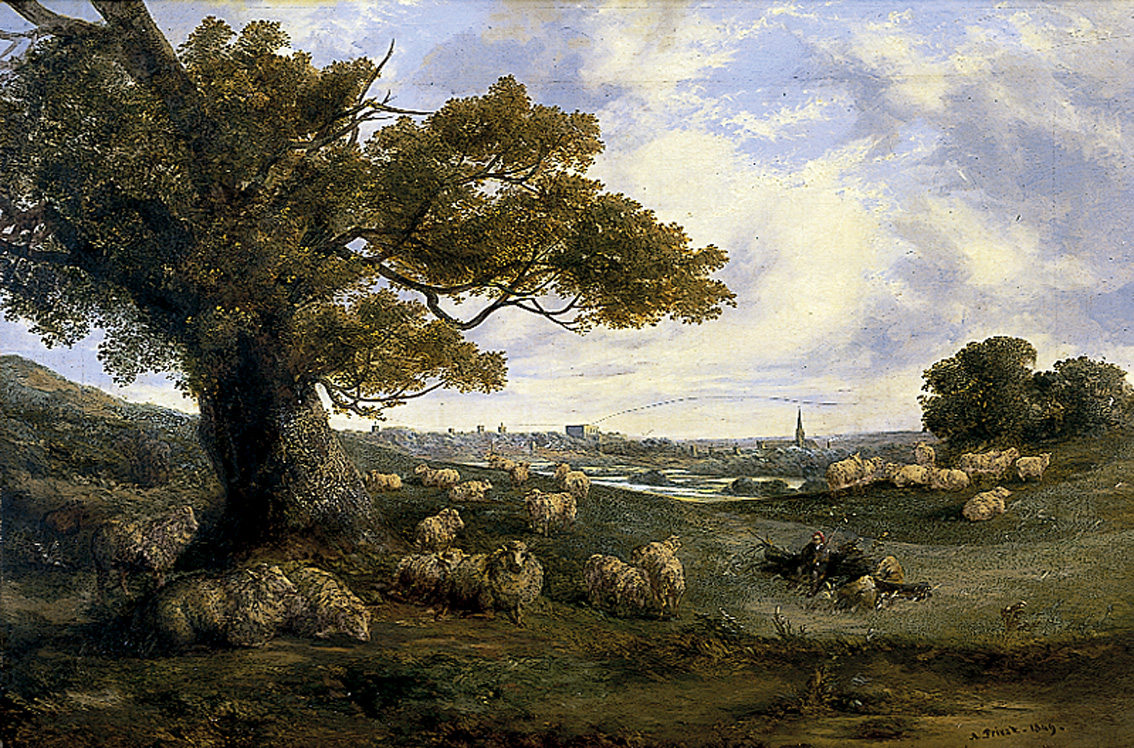
Norwich from the South East (1849), Norfolk Museums Collections

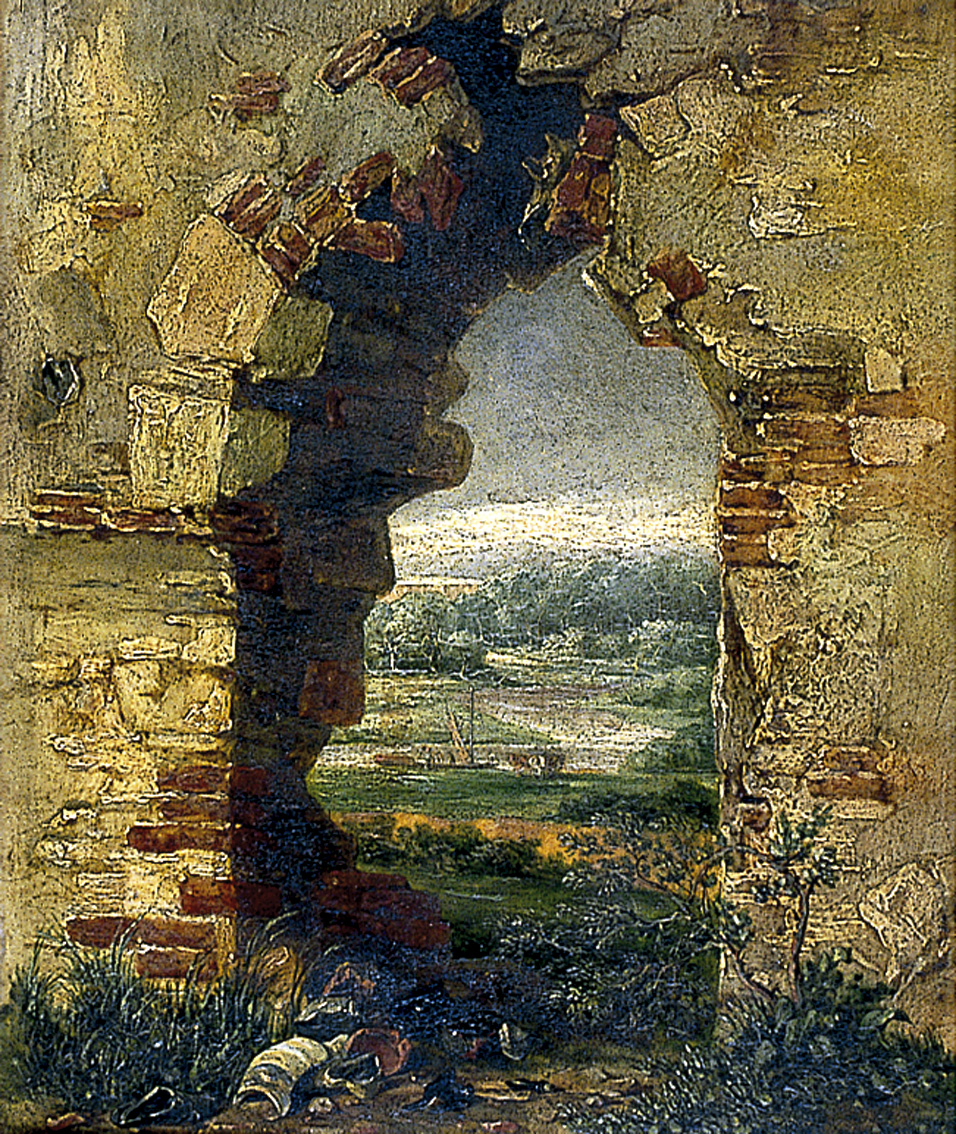
Thorpe River, Norwich (undated), Norfolk Museums Collections

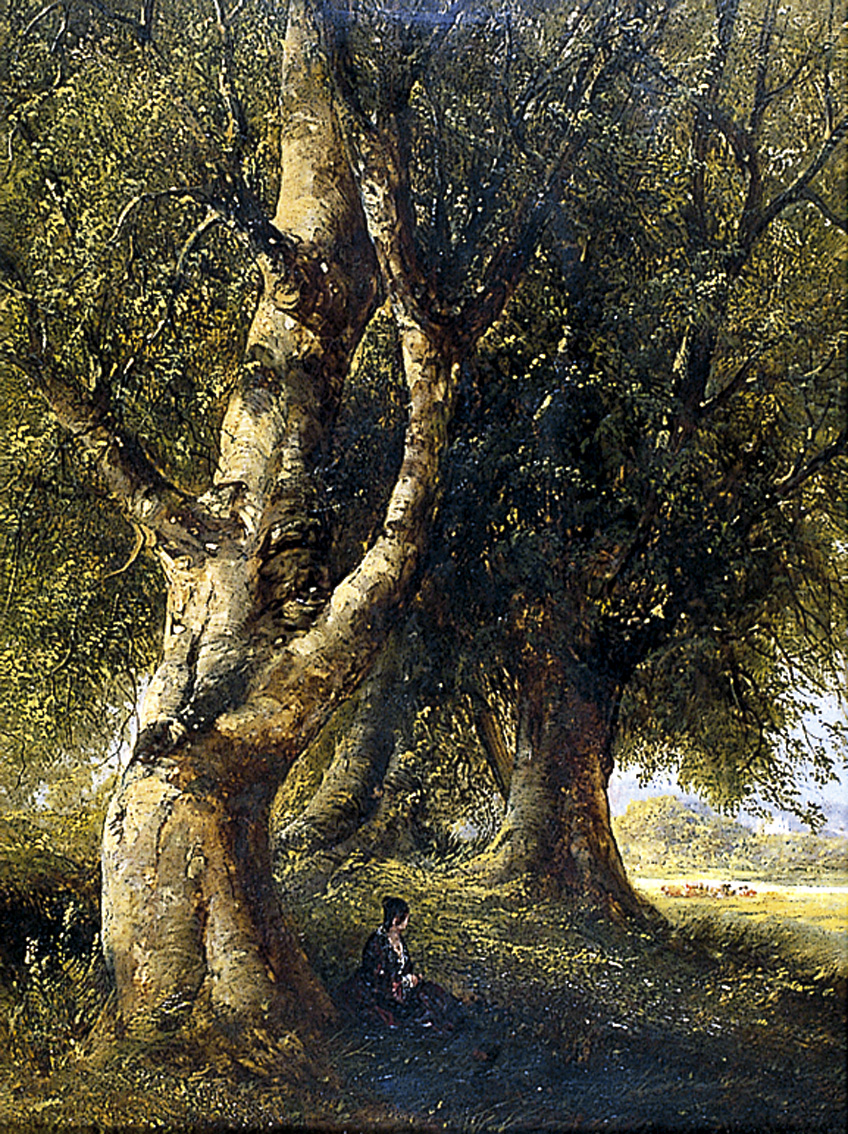
Beech trees, grazing cattle to right (undated), Norfolk Museums Collections

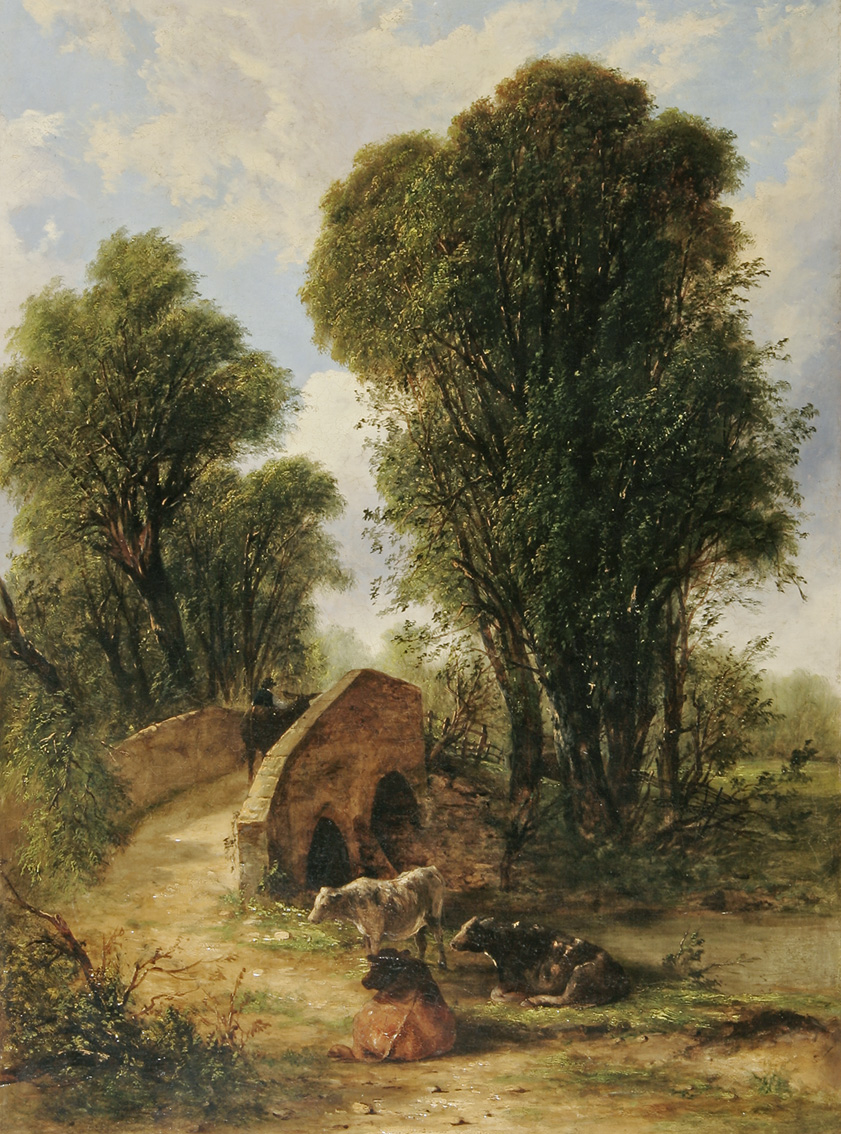
Godstowe Bridge, Oxford 1844, Norfolk Museums Collections

=== Etchings ===
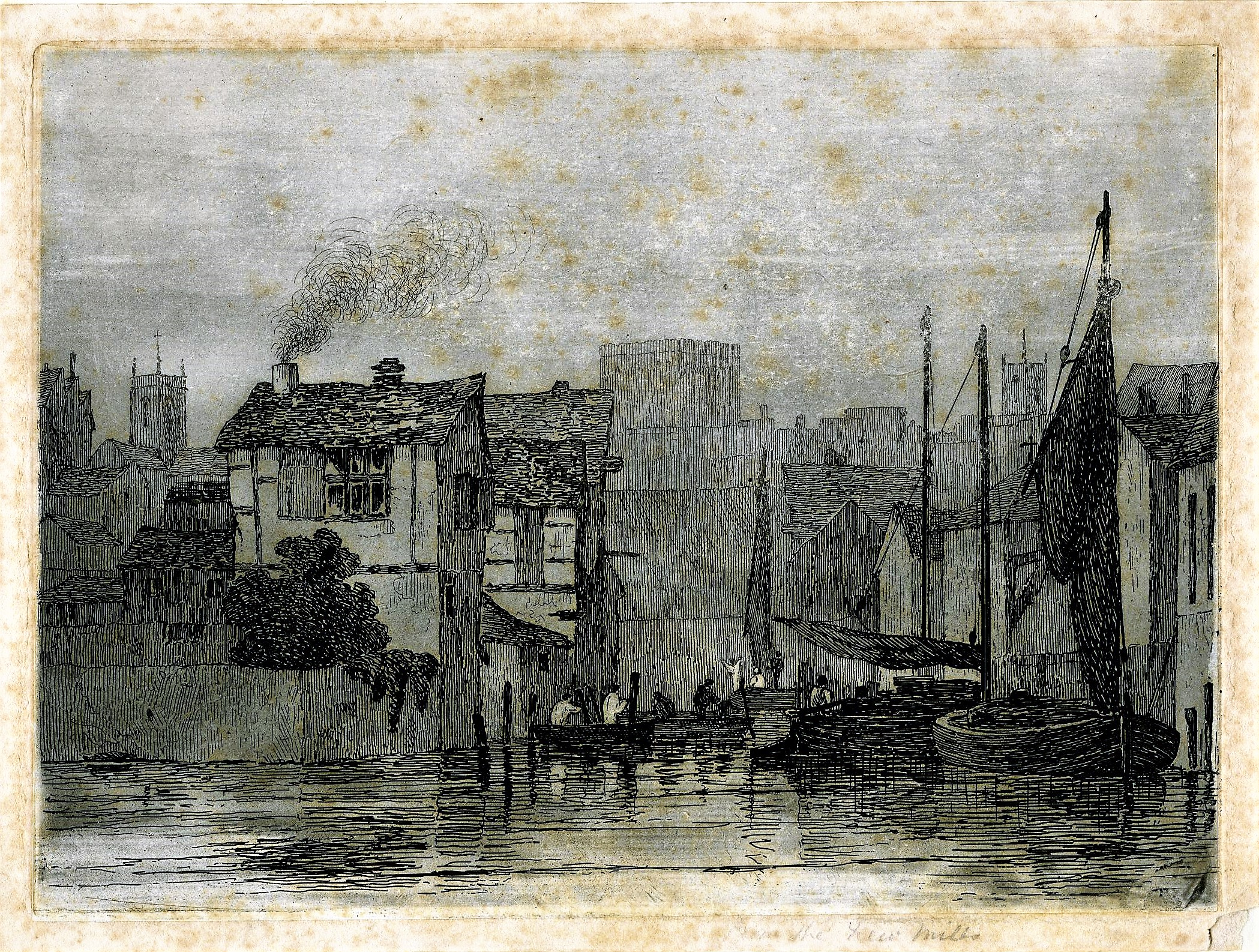
Front of New Mills, Norwich (undated), British Museum

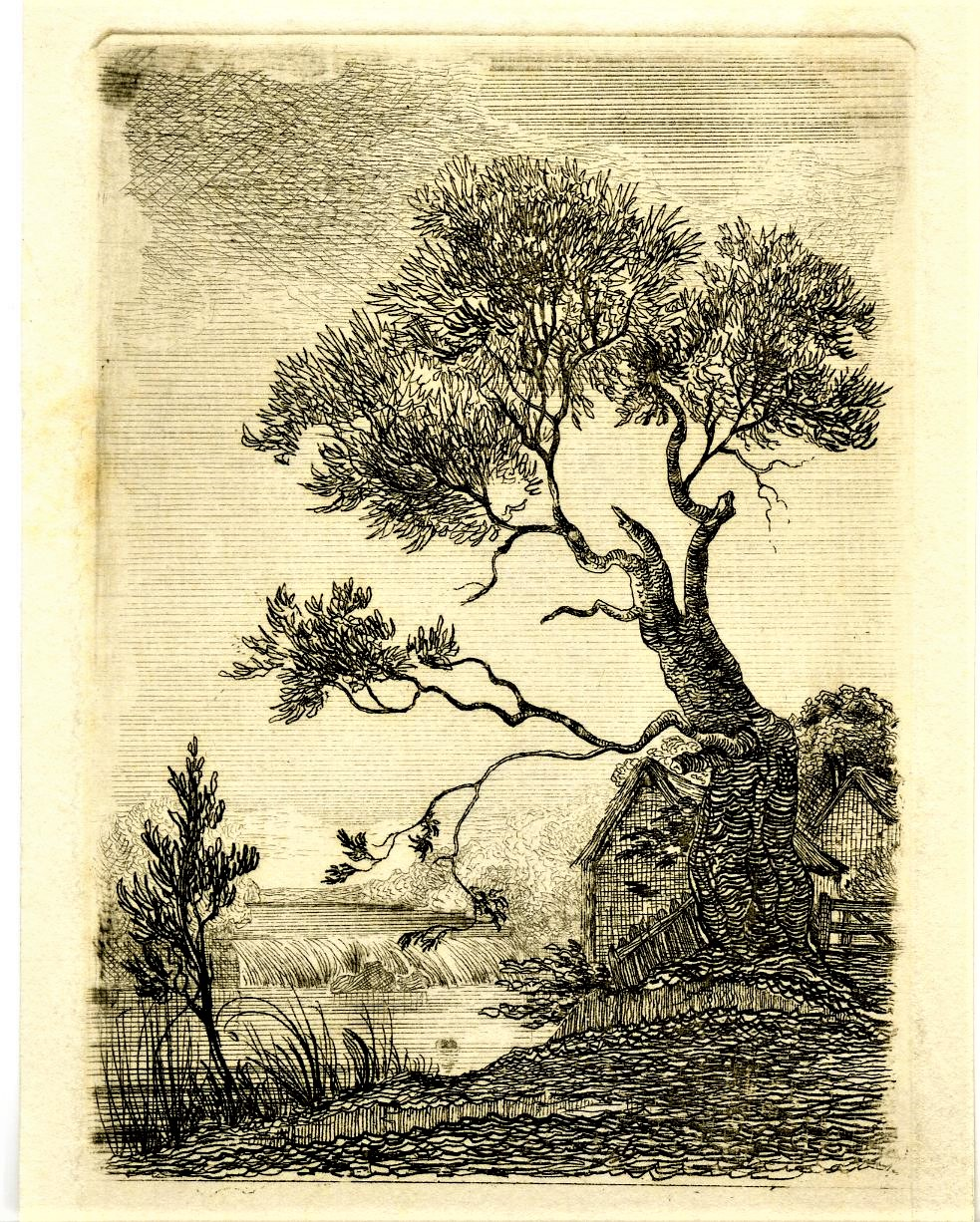
View with cottages behind tree (undated), British Museum

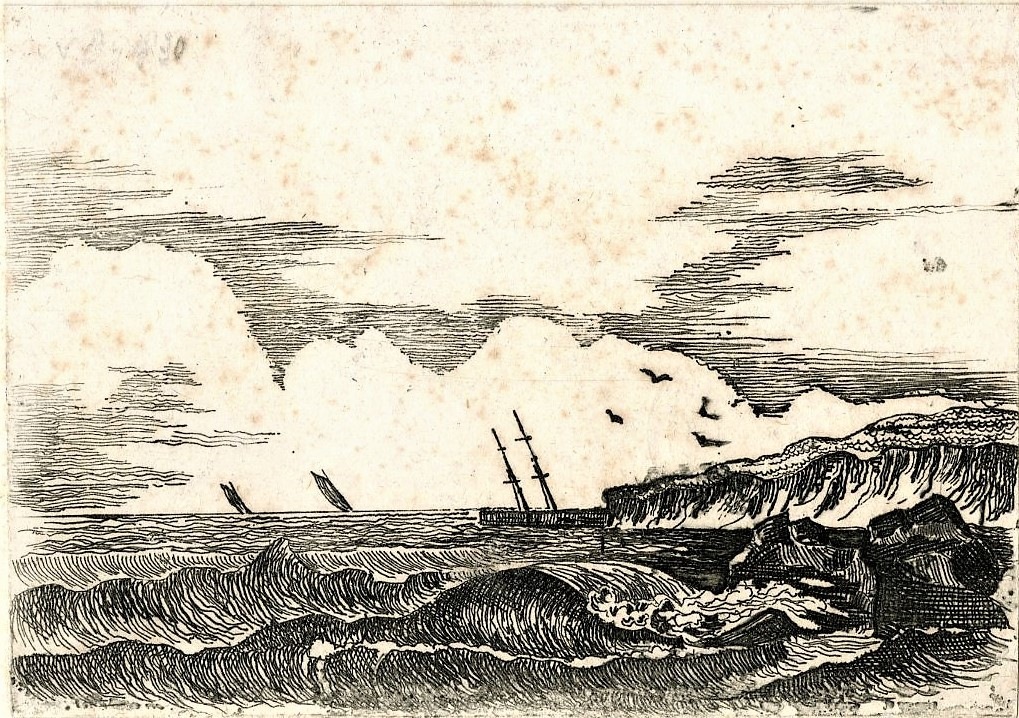
Coastal view (1830), British Museum

== Bibliography ==
- Day, Harold (1968). East Anglian Painters. Vol. II. Eastbourne, UK: Eastbourne Fine Art. ISBN 978-0-902010-10-9.
- Dickes, William Frederick (1905). The Norwich school of painting: being a full account of the Norwich exhibitions, the lives of the painters, the lists of their respective exhibits and descriptions of the pictures. Norwich: Jarrold & Sons Ltd. OCLC 558218061.
- Moore, Andrew W. (1985). The Norwich School of Artists. London: HMSO/Norwich Museums Service. ISBN 978-0-903101-48-6.
- Searle, Geoffrey R. (2015). Etchings of the Norwich School. Norwich: Lasse Press. ISBN 978-0-95687-589-1.
- Walpole, Josephine (1997). Art and Artists of the Norwich School. Woodbridge: Antique Collectors' Club Holme. ISBN 978-1-85149-261-9.
