= Beaufort House (Chelsea) =

Country house in Chelsea, England

Coordinates: 51.483°N 0.175°W

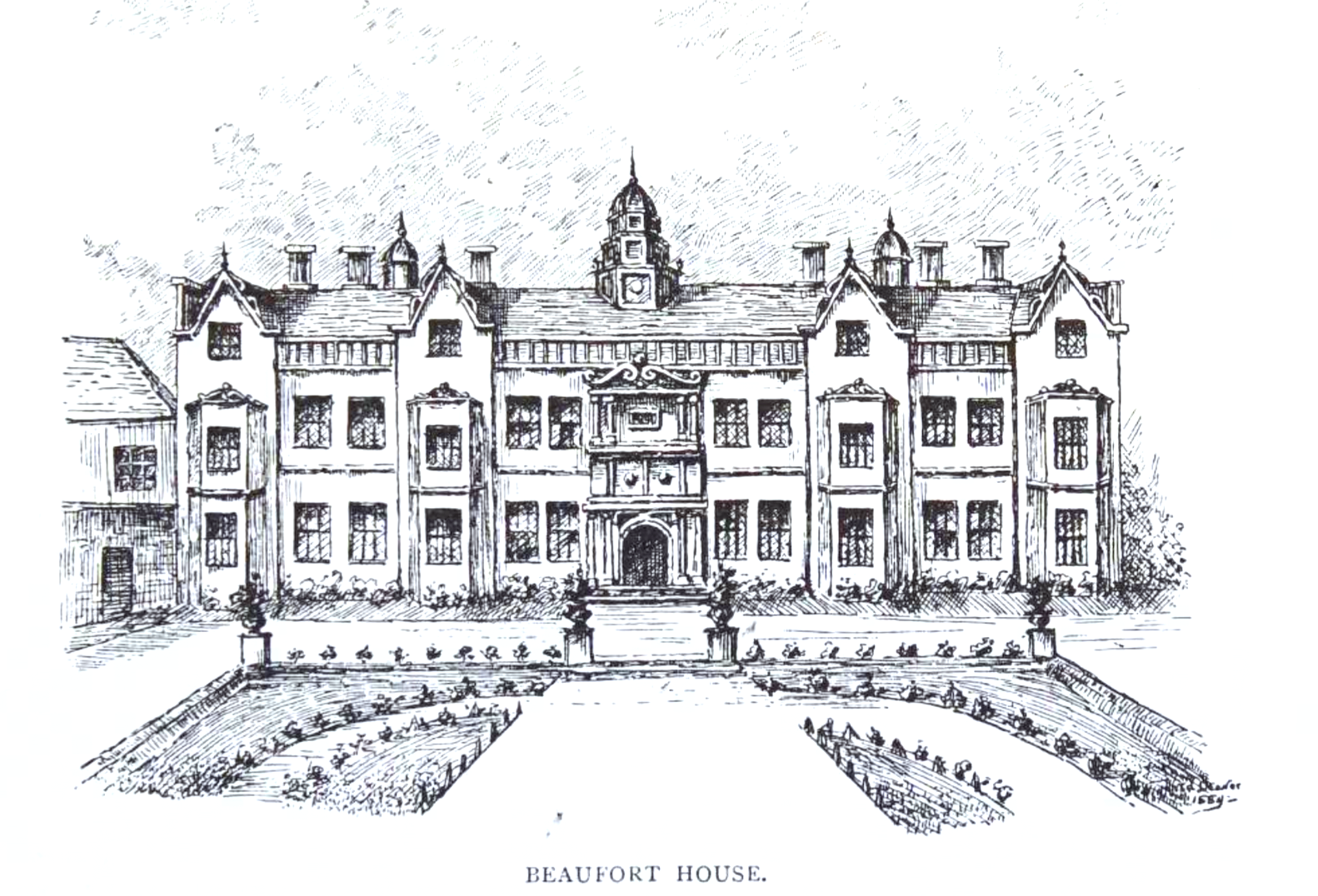
Beaufort House circa 1520

Beaufort House was a grand mansion built beside the River Thames at Chelsea, London, by Thomas More in about 1520, while he held the position of Lord Chancellor to King Henry VIII. On his arrest in 1534 all of More's property was forfeit to the Crown. The house was given the name of Beaufort House only in 1682, when it passed into the hands of the 1st Duke of Beaufort. It was demolished in 1739, giving its name to present-day Beaufort Street.

== History ==
As More's royal duties frequently required his attendance at the king's Thames-side palaces in both Richmond and Greenwich, it was convenient to select a riverside property situated between them (the common method of transport being by boat) for his home. In about 1520, for £30 (equivalent to £24,000 in 2025) he purchased a 27-acre (11-hectare) parcel of land stretching from the Thames in Chelsea to the present-day King's Road; the east and west boundaries are represented by the present-day Old Church Street and Millman's Street. There he built a dignified red-brick mansion (known simply as More's house or Chelsea House). As well as a family chapel within the building, More had built a separate, small chapel in the grounds for himself for solitary prayer and penance.

More moved in by 1525, as is shown by the bawdy poem The Twelve Mery Jestes of Wyddow Edyth, written by a member of More's household (or even by More himself) using the pseudonym of "Walter Smith" and published in March of that year: the widow arrives by boat at "Chelsay[…]where she had best cheare of all/in the house of Syr Thomas More."

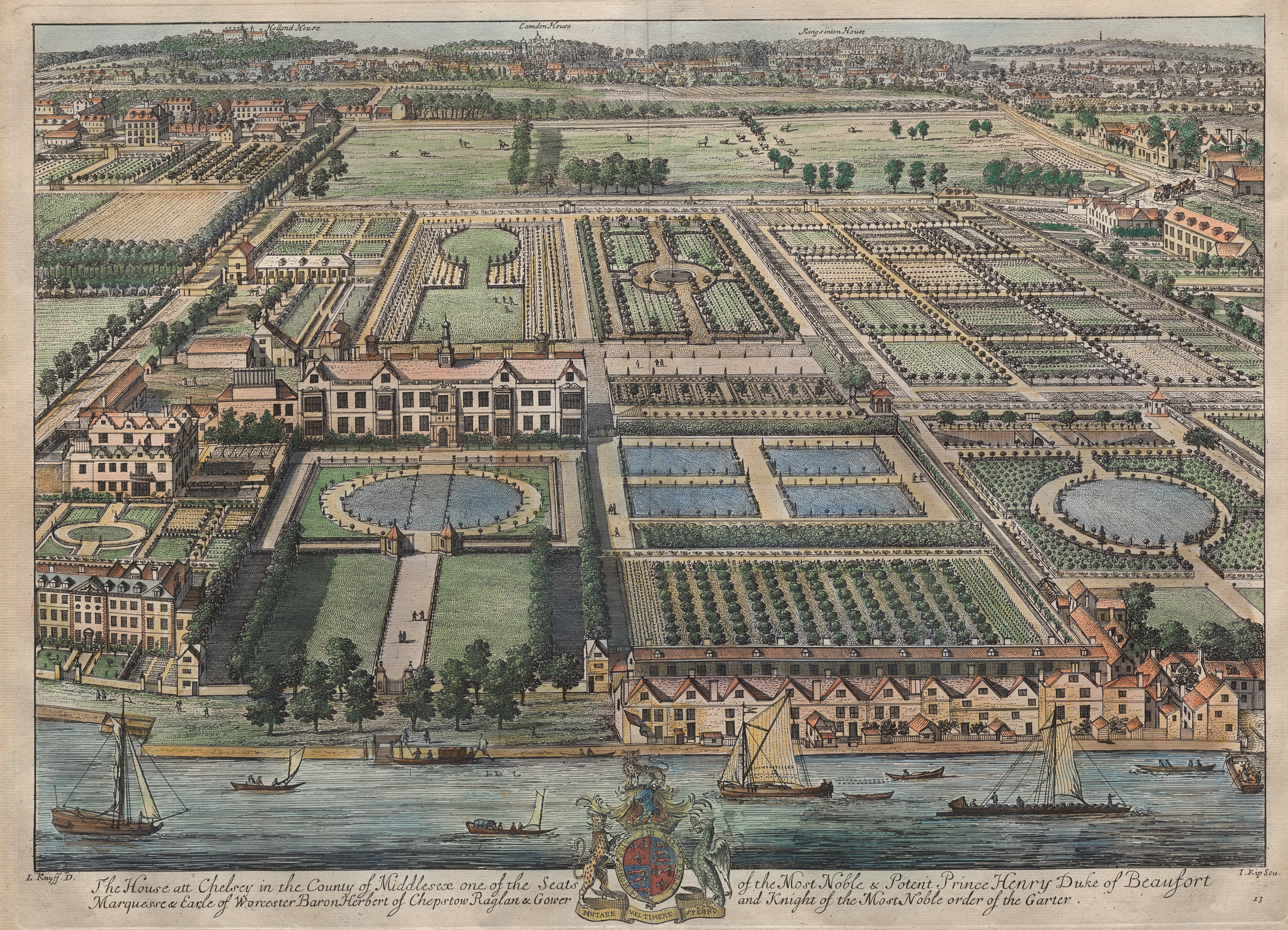
Beaufort House circa 1708

Upon More's arrest in 1534 the estate was confiscated, coming into the possession of the Comptroller of the Royal Household, William Paulet. In 1538 it was considered sufficiently impressive to give as temporary accommodation to Louis de Perreau, Sieur de Castillon, the French ambassador to the English court; the delicate matter of choosing a French royal wife for King Henry (after the death of Queen Jane Seymour) was under consideration. Subsequent owners associated with the royal household included Paulet's son, John Paulet, 2nd Marquess of Winchester, and Gregory Fiennes, Lord Dacre of the South. After the execution of Fiennes the house passed to Lord Burleigh, Queen Elizabeth's chief minister, to be followed by his youngest son, Sir Robert Cecil, afterwards Earl of Salisbury, who took possession in 1597. Cecil remodelled the front of the house in 1597, using the designs of architect John Thorpe, but shortly afterwards he sold it to Henry Clinton, 2nd Earl of Lincoln in order to buy property nearer to Westminster.

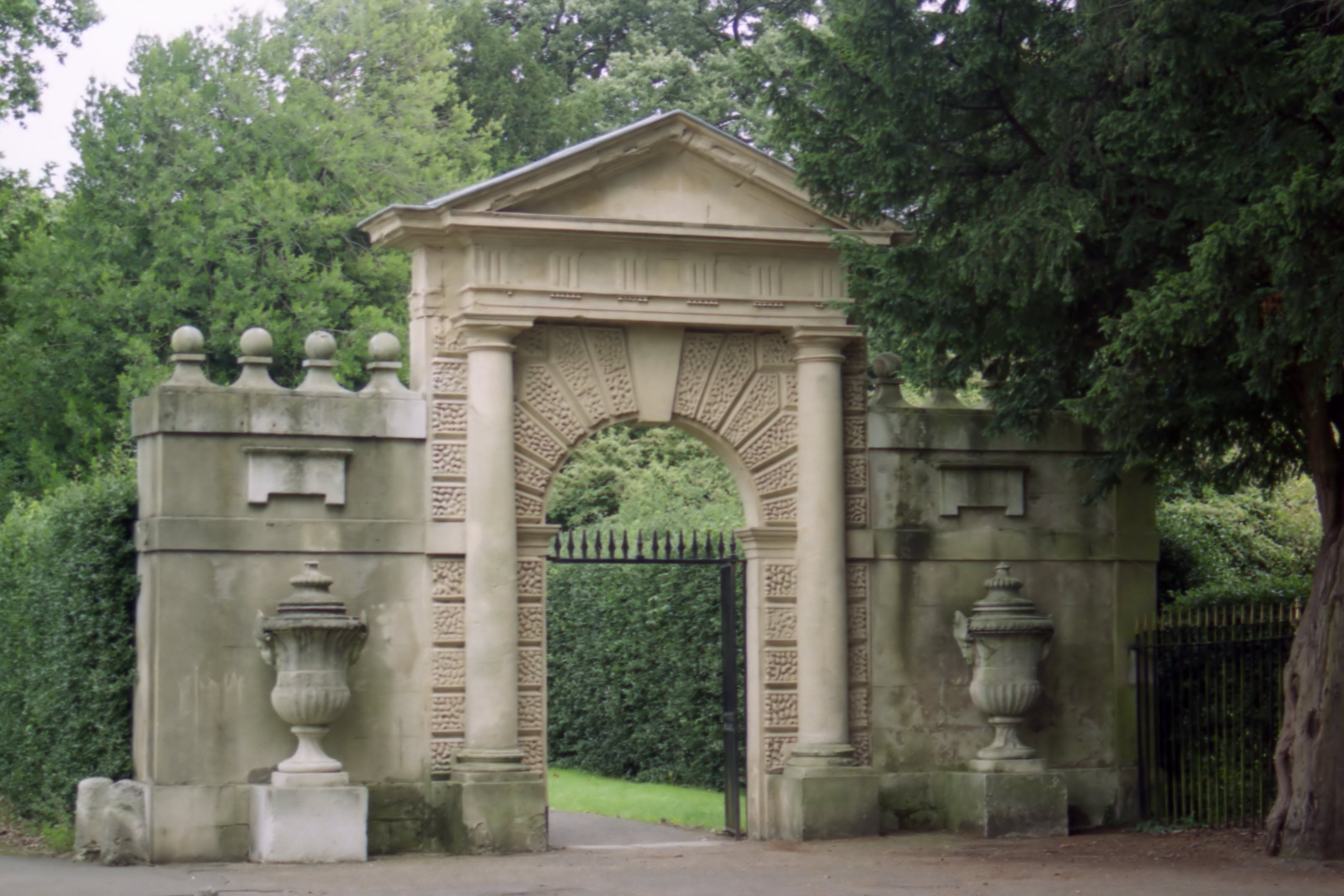
The north gate of Beaufort House, now at Chiswick Park, London

By 1620 the property had passed through the hands of the Earl of Lincoln into the possession of the earl's son-in-law Sir Arthur Gorges, who sold it to Lionel Cranfield, 1st Earl of Middlesex. In 1627, Cranfield surrendered the estate to the Duke of Buckingham, when it became known as Buckingham House. In 1674, it was acquired by the Earl of Bristol, whose widow Anne sold it to the Marquess of Worcester, the future Duke of Beaufort. In 1682 the property was renamed Beaufort House after its new owner. It gave its name to the present-day Beaufort Street.

The final owner, from 1737, was Sir Hans Sloane, who demolished the building in 1740. The north (Kings Road) gate to the property, designed by Inigo Jones, was saved and transported to Chiswick House.
