= Beaufort Street, Chelsea =

Street in Chelsea, London

Beaufort Street
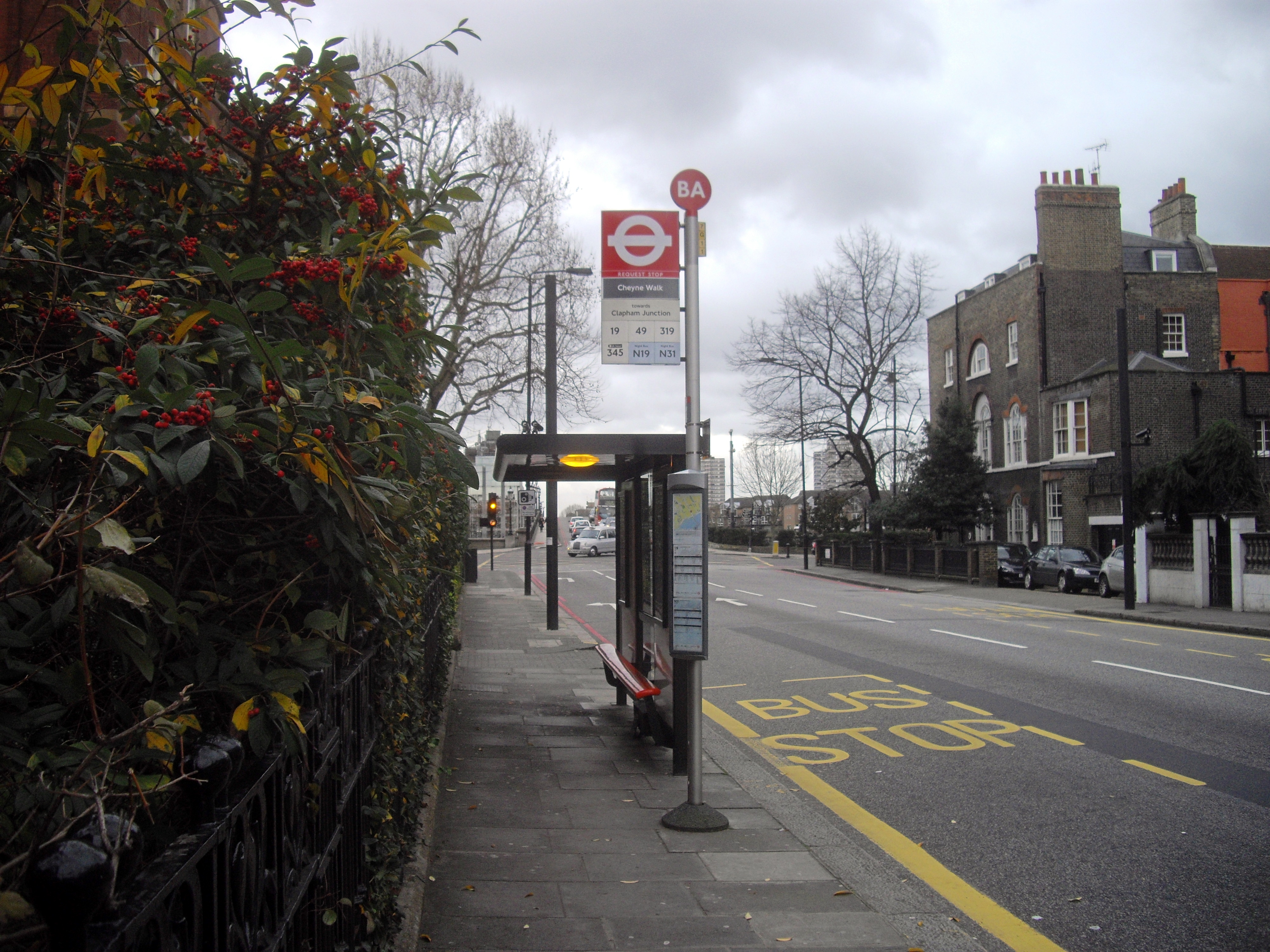
- Bus stop in Beaufort Street
- Interactive map of Beaufort Street
- Type: Street
- Area: Chelsea
- Location: Royal Borough of Kensington and Chelsea, London, England
- Postal code: SW3
- Coordinates: 51°28′59.9″N 0°10′28.52″W
- North: Fulham Road (A308), Drayton Gardens
- South: Cheyne Walk (A3220/A3212), Battersea Bridge, River Thames

Beaufort Street is a street in Chelsea, London SW3. It runs north to south from Fulham Road to Cheyne Walk at its junction with Battersea Bridge, and is bisected by the King's Road.

== History ==
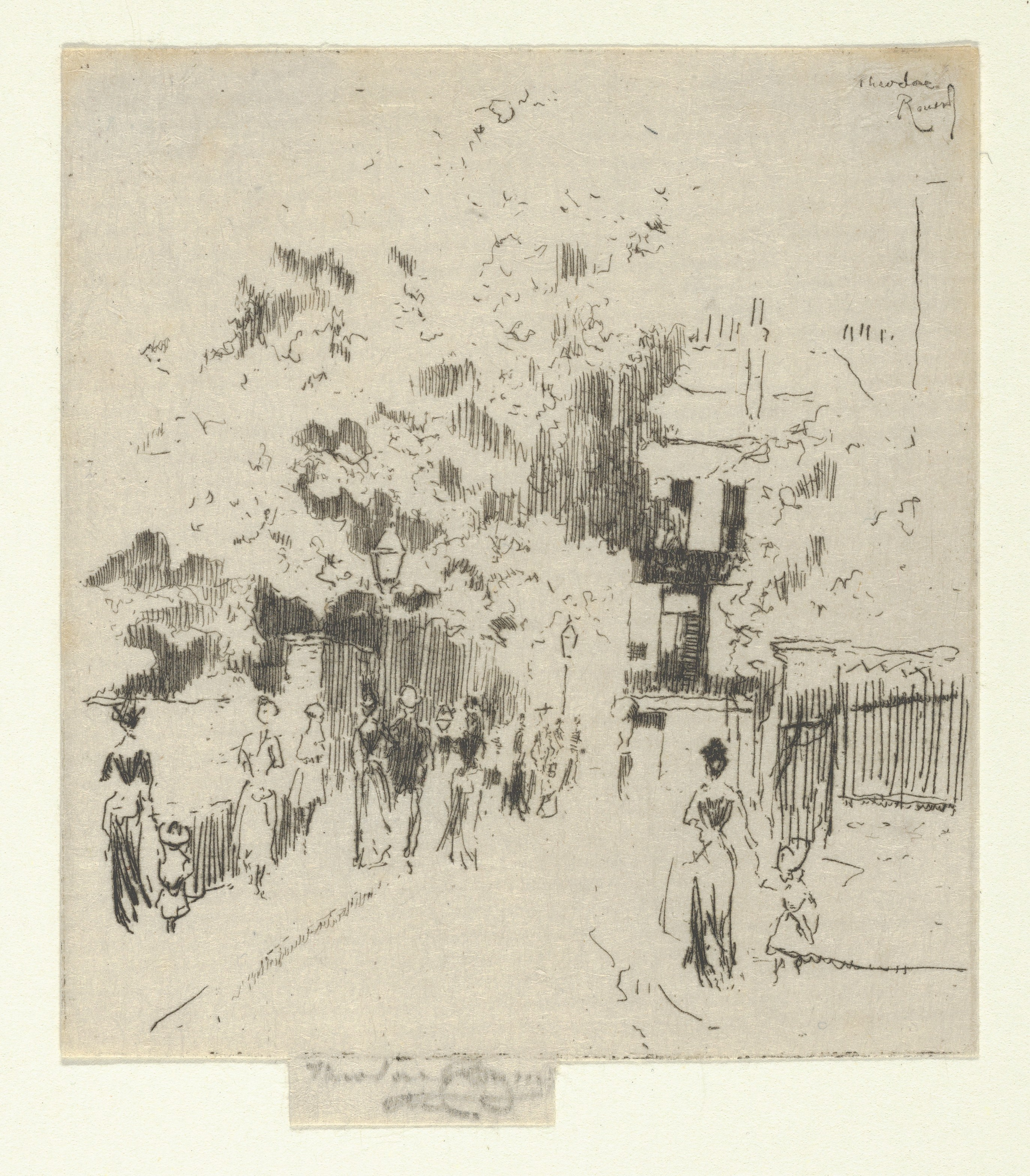
Bank Holiday, Corner of Beaufort Street, Chelsea, an 1889 etching by Théodore Roussel

Beaufort Street is named after Sir Thomas More's home Beaufort House where he lived from 1520 to 1535; it was from Beaufort House that More was taken to the Tower of London, where he was executed. A Samuel Travers acquired Beaufort House in 1724 with the intention of opening it as a school, but was unsuccessful in doing so. Travers's executors subsequently sold the house to Hans Sloane, the owner of the manor of Chelsea, in 1737. The house was pulled down by Sloane in 1740 after having lain empty for 20 years. The former area of the Beaufort House estate became known as Beaufort Ground, encompassing an area from the King's Road to an open ground called Beaufort Green on the banks of the River Thames. The Beaufort Ground was leased for 91 years to the trustees of the Moravian congregation, an expatriate Protestant denomination, who had previously acquired the adjoining Lindsey House. The Moravian community under Nicolaus Zinzendorf created a burial ground and chapel on the site of the former stable yard of Beaufort House; this was reached by a passageway from the rear of Lindsay House. The community intended to start a Moravian settlement named Sharon on the rest of the Beaufort Ground, but were financially precluded from doing so by Zinzendorf's departure from England in 1755. The Beaufort Ground was subsequently leased as building plots by the 1770s. A 1781 inventory of the estate had measured it at 7 acres and the present Beaufort Street was laid down through the site.

The only listed building on Beaufort Street is the chapel of Allen Hall Seminary, the Roman Catholic seminary of the Province of Westminster. It is Grade II listed on the National Heritage List for England. The chapel was designed by 1958 by Hector Corfiato and is described in its Historic England heritage listing as demonstrating "a fine example of structural rationalism, dominated by a dramatic concrete-grid façade, and using the internal portal frame to fine dramatic and spatial effect". Allen Hall occupies a site that was bought in 1886 from George Cadogan, 5th Earl Cadogan, by Kenelm Vaughan, the founder of the Brotherhood of Expiation. The first chapel on the site was converted from two artists studios that had been built in 1879 by the artist and architect William Burges for the painters Louise Jopling and her husband Joseph Middleton Jopling.

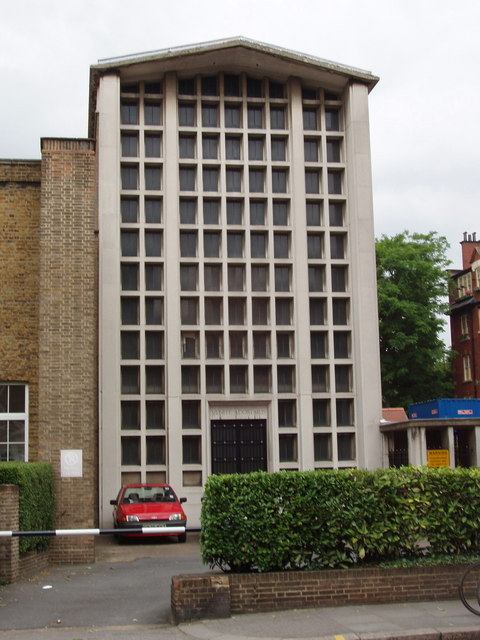
The chapel of Allen Hall Seminary in June 2008

In her biography of Roger Fry, written in 1940, Virginia Woolf wrote that "Beaufort Street, whatever may have happened to the world since 1892, is practically unchanged. The years have given it neither dignity nor romance. The houses remain monotonously respectable and identical".

== Notable residents ==
- Sir Thomas More, Lord High Chancellor of England, lived from 1520 to 1535 in Beaufort House, on the site of the later Beaufort Street.
- The painter Arthur James Stark was born on Beaufort Street in 1831.
- Louise and Joseph Middleton Jopling lived at No. 28, Joseph died there in 1884.
- Roger Fry, artist, set up a small studio at 29 Beaufort Street in 1892, on his return to England after studies in Paris. He shared the accommodation with verse playwright Robert Trevelyan.
- The writer and raconteur Quentin Crisp lived on the first floor of No. 129 for more than thirty years. His notably squalid lodgings inspired Harold Pinter to write his 1957 play The Room. Crisp said of his living conditions that "after four years the dirt doesn't get any dirtier".
- The GP and Labour MP Ethel Bentham died at her home at 100 Beaufort Street in 1931. The travel agent and Women's Royal Naval Service organizer Edith Frances Crowdy subsequently lived there in the 1940s.
- The composer and playwright Julian Slade spent his latter years in a basement flat at 86 Beaufort Street; he died in 2006.
- The Scottish writer and scholar George Sutherland Fraser lived at 75 Beaufort Street with his mother and sister after being demobbed from the British Army following the Second World War. Fraser subsequently met his wife, Eileen Lucy Andrew, a fellow poet and resident of Beaufort Street, and the pair married in 1946.
- The novelist and biographer Elizabeth Gaskell (a.k.a. Mrs Gaskell, 1810–1865) lived at No. 7 Beaufort Street in 1811 and 1827–29.
- Charles Ricketts lived at number 31 when writing to Oscar Wilde.
