= Sillett =

Sillett is a surname. Notable people with the surname include:

- Charlie Sillett (1906–1945), English professional footballer
- Emma Sillett (1802–1880), English painter
- James Sillett (1764–1840), English painter
- John Sillett (1936–2021), English football player and manager
- Keith Sillett (born 1929), Australian cricket player
- Pauline Sillett (born 1949), British swimmer
- Peter Sillett (1933–1998), English football player
- Stephen C. Sillett (born 1968), American botanist
