= Thomas Baynes =

Thomas Baynes may refer to:

- Thomas Mann Baynes (1794–1876), English artist and lithographer
- Thomas Spencer Baynes (1823–1887), English philosopher
