= Joseph Booth (actor) =

Joseph Booth (a stage name, real surname Martin) (died 1797) was an English tradesman, actor and inventor.

== Theatrical career ==
Booth's life is not well documented. Initially a hosier at Mansfield, Nottinghamshire, he went on the stage.

In 1774, when he recruited Thomas Holcroft to his company at Carlisle, Booth was a provincial theatrical manager in the north of England. The position was a temporary one, the company manager West Digges being absent. The company contained other well-known names: Elizabeth Inchbald, James Perry, William Shield. A business proposition concerned with making reproductions of paintings, by a process kept secret, was something Booth discussed with Holcroft around 1780; at this period he was an assistant prompter at Covent Garden Theatre. He also claimed an invention relating to textile manufacture.

== The Polygraphic Society ==
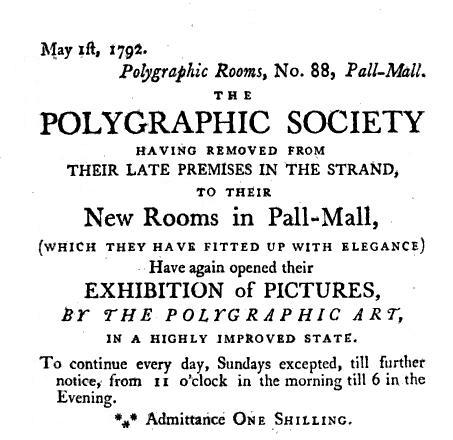
Polygraphic Society 1792 advertisement from The Critical Review

Booth in London set up the Polygraphic Society. It held annual exhibitions, after Booth had published a pamphlet explaining the scheme in 1784. It also issued catalogues of the reproduction paintings available in "polygraphic" form. The first catalogue, of 24 paintings, was issued from The Strand, London. The 1792 catalogue is of 80 paintings, and the Society's premises were then in Pall Mall, at Schomberg House. The Society left its mark on Schomberg House by adding the Coade stone figures to the porch in 1791.

The initial name for the polygraphic works was "pollaplasiasmos" (sometimes spelled "polyplasiasmos"). Thomas Jefferson bought one in London, of The Prodigal Son by Benjamin West, and it hung at Monticello.

The Society's workshop, destroyed by fire in 1793, was at Woolwich Common. There it employed artists to finish partial printed copies in oils. Known to have been employed in this work are: James Baynes, Isaac Jehner, James Sillett, and the English-American portraitist William J. Weaver.

The Society closed down in 1794. Towards the end it was sharing its premises with the New Shakespeare Gallery of James Woodmason, a rival to the Boydell Shakespeare Gallery elsewhere in Pall Mall. The last polygraphic picture exhibition started on 10 December 1794, leading up to a final auction in April 1795 and the sale of the lease. The Times had commented on the concentration of these innovative galleries. According to Hazlitt, Holcroft was several hundred pounds the poorer for the collapse of the Society.

Booth died on 25 February 1797, in Cumberland Gardens, Vauxhall. Sillett wrote in 1808 in the Monthly Magazine stating there was no loss of the mystery or trade secrets; that Booth had been bought out some time before he died; and that the polygraphic work had continued after the fire for a year or so at Walham Green. The 1795 auction was advertised by the executors of Thomas Goddard, who had held the lease on the Polygraphic Rooms in Pall Mall for the Society from 1792.

== Aftermath ==
There is no concrete evidence to connect Booth's process with that of Francis Eginton, even if at the time the two may have been assumed related. Weaver was advertising the "polygraphic art" in New York in 1805.

James Perry made an effort to continue the "polygraphic art" south-west of London; Pryse Gordon in 1830 decried Booth as a charlatan, and told of Booth's textile scheme in connection with Perry and his colleague James Gray. Richard Alfred Davenport writing in 1837, rather dismissively, mentioned that at least eight exhibitions were held, and suggested that the process used multiple blocks, an innovation that had been tried again recently. In the 1860s the works of the Polygraphic Society were brought up in a debate on the priority for photography.

== Family ==
Booth married an actress named Malatratt. William Martin was their son.
