= James Baynes =

English painter

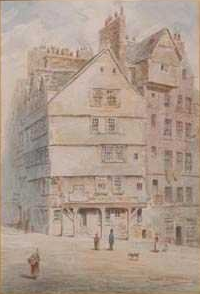
A Street Corner Scene with Figures by James Baynes

James Baynes (5 April 1766 – 12 May 1837) was an English watercolour painter and drawing-master.

== Early life and family ==
Little is known of his family apart from the fact that he was born in Lancaster as the son of a local tradesman and was the eldest of six children, his grandfather being a Catholic priest in Kirkby Lonsdale where his father was born. As a boy he showed a love of the arts and had been employed to draw heads and work devices until Dr. Campbell, a local physician, having seen some of these works sent some sketches to his friend George Romney. The young Baynes was then sent to London to study under Romney at the expense of Dr. Campbell.

In 1784, at the age of 18, he became a student at the Royal Academy. He wedded Mary Mann (1766–1845) in 1785 at Marylebone Church, London. Their son, Thomas Mann Baynes (1794–1854), was also a noted watercolour artist.

== Career ==
The marriage was without the consent of Campbell, his patron, and this resulted in a loss of support for Baynes and the withdrawal of the opportunity for an Italian tour. Thrown on his own resources he obtained employment from the Polygraphic Society, a Woolwich based company formed for the reproduction of pictures. The company produced reproductions of celebrated works and having touched them up by hand, sold them at a fee. Baynes was to earn £100 a year for this work. The failure of the company lead to his move to Chelsea, followed by moves to 38 Dean Street, Soho, 103 Wardour Street and finally 73 Castle Street near Oxford Street where he remained for 40 years until his death in 1837.

A large proportion of his time was occupied in teaching drawing (in which he had a good practice) and working for architects such as Sir Jeffry Wyattville. Among his pupils were John Wood, who produced a portrait of Baynes; Sir Henry Sass, who founded a school of art, Sass's Academy, in Bloomsbury; and J.D. Harding, the landscape painter whose name is connected with the advancement of lithography. Baynes's teaching activities and his ever-expanding family (he had eight children) put pressure on his own landscape painting. He was, however, a constant exhibitor of watercolours, and occasionally oils, at the Royal Academy between 1796 and 1837. He specialised in watercolour drawings of Norfolk, North Wales, Cumberland and later, Kent. Frequently he introduced figures and cattle.

Both Baynes and his wife were members of the Sandemanian Church. The Sandemanians were a small, devoted and fundamentalist Christian sect that formed tight-knit communities of small congregations across the UK and in Danbury, Connecticut. The London community boasted Michael Faraday amongst its deacon elders. In the north of England it is likely that Baynes was a member of one of the Cumbrian branches but on his move to London he made his confession of faith and became a full member of the London congregation (Paul's Alley in the Barbican) in June 1792, some nine months after Michael Faraday's birth.

Baynes drew landscapes while traveling in England and Wales. His sketch books show that he visited the South of England in 1802, Wales and the West of England in 1810, Cumberland in 1815 and Kent in 1816.

James Baynes died of an 'affection of the heart' on 12 May 1837. Both he and his wife Mary are buried in St. Johns Wood Cemetery, London.

== Works ==
Baynes' works include:

- The Well in Carisbrook Castle (31.5 x 28, ink and wash)
- Castle Ruins with Figures (45.4 x 62.4, watercolour on paper)
- Caernarvon Castle Across the River (37.7 x 53.8, watercolour on paper)
- City Street Corner Scene with Figures (26.03 x 18.16, watercolour on paper)
- Figures on a Lakeland Track (18 x 29, watercolour on paper)

== Bibliography ==
- Groves, Algernon: A Dictionary of Artists Who Have Exhibited Works in the Principal London Exhibitions 1760-1893, Kingsmead reprints, 1970.
- Cantor, Geoffrey: Michael Faraday, Sandemanian and Scientist, Macmillan, 1991.
