= Isaac Jehner =

English painter

- Born: 2 December 1750; Westminster, London
- Died: 2 July 1818 (aged 67)
- Other names: Isaac Jenner, J. Jehner

Isaac Jehner (2 December 1750 – 1818) was a painter and engraver who worked in the West Country and London. He changed his name to Jenner in 1806.

== Biography ==
Jehner was born, the last of eighteen children, in Queen's Head Court, Great Windmill Street, Westminster, London to Johan Jehner, a German-born gunsmith silver planisher. His mother died whilst he was an infant. At the age of eleven years he damaged his legs leaving him of limited stature and disabled. Jehner later wrote of his childhood claiming that he was taught to read eating gingerbread letters. His father mixed with a group of artists and the young Jehner got himself apprenticed to an elderly draughtsman. His master retired and set Jehner up with basic equipment. Despite his disability he obtained work with the mezzotint engraver William Pether. Jehner realised that there was a large but competitive business for prints and if he was to gain more business he decided to learn how to paint in oils.

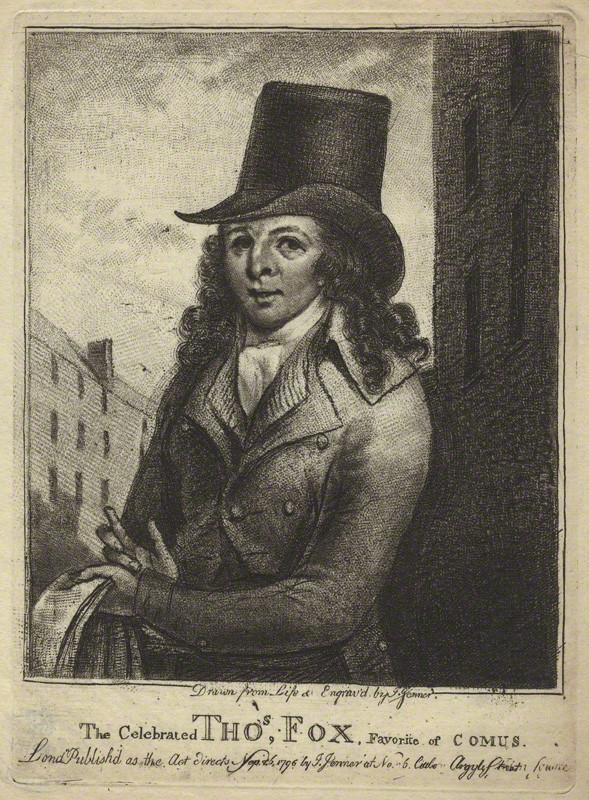
Thomas Fox by (and engraved by) Isaac Jehner

Jehner and Elizabeth, his wife, went to Lille where Jehner learnt about painting and also made a useful business contact in Marmaduke Gwynne (a relative of Marmaduke Gwynne who was an early Welsh Methodist) who bought his prints and introduced him to useful contacts. Gwynn and Jehner resolved to return to the United Kingdom, but Jehner was delayed due to a problem with his passport.

In May 1780 Jehner moved to Exeter with his wife and his baby son who was also called Isaac. They stayed there briefly before moving to Plymouth. He started another drawing school and picked up business from the Freemasons after he joined the local lodge. Jehner painted an altarpiece in Saltash which set him up for further work at the important Bristol church of St Mary, Redcliffe. Jehner and his three sons were in Bristol from 1785 to 1880. Whilst there he set up a shop in Bath but he received a more regular income by working for the Polygraphic Society in Woolwich. This society created copies of oil paintings at a reduced cost by partially printing the design which they sold at Schomberg House in Pall Mall. A fire ended the enterprise in 1793. Whilst at Woolwich, Jehner created silk paintings using a novel technique that made the pieces look like stained glass.

Jehner's life was recorded in a short 1806 auto-biography called "Fortune's Football: An autobiography for children" which was ascribed to "Isaac Jenner". Jehner died in 1818 leaving many engravings of his own work as well as many based on paintings by other notable artists like Pieter Bruegel the Elder, Hogarth, William Parry and Antonio da Correggio. His work is in the National Portrait Gallery in London.
