= William J. Weaver =

British-American portrait artist (1759-1817)

William Joseph Weaver (1759-1817) was an artist born in London who came to prominence in North America. His portrait of Alexander Hamilton hangs in the United States State Department, and his full-length portrait of Prince Edward, Duke of Kent and Strathearn, hangs in Province House (Nova Scotia), Canada. He also worked for Joseph Booth's Polygraphic Society.

Former Director and Chief Curator of the Munson-Williams-Proctor Arts Institute Paul Schweizer writes that Weaver's work "convey [s] a chaste elegance that is similar in look and mood to the finest neoclassical portraits made in North America." Weaver's composition reflects a knowledge of British and French military portraiture. He painted portraits and miniatures in many of the principal cities along the Atlantic seaboard from Halifax, Nova Scotia, to Savannah, Georgia. He also produced portraits of Martha and George Washington, though their locations are unknown.

Weaver was one of the first professional artists to work in Halifax (c. 1797). He made portraits or miniatures of the city's merchants, aristocrats and military officers. Currently, six small portraits that Weaver painted in Nova Scotia have been identified. Five of these were painted on tinplate. There are likely more that are unsigned.

== Gallery ==
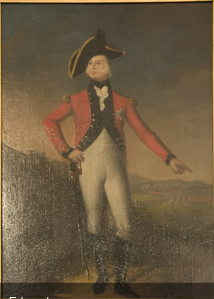
Prince Edward, Duke of Kent and Strathearn, Province House (Nova Scotia)

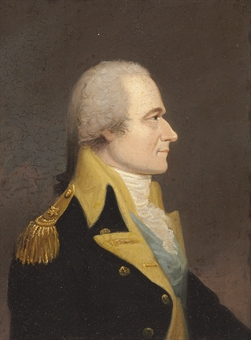
Alexander Hamilton, United States State Department

== Links ==
- US State Department – Weaver’s portrait of Alexander Hamilton
- Smithsonian Institution - William J. Weaver
