= William Richards (minister) =

Welsh Baptist minister

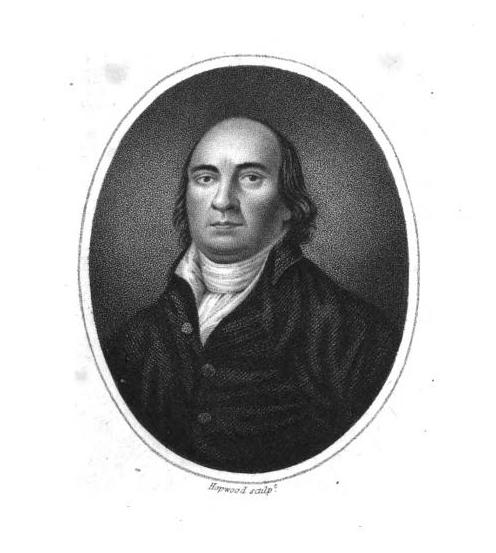
William Richards

William Richards (1749 – 13 September 1818) was a Welsh Baptist minister; he spent much of his life in King's Lynn, in Norfolk, and wrote a history of the town. His other publications included a Welsh-English dictionary.

== Life ==
Richards was born at Penrydd, near Haverfordwest, Pembrokeshire, towards the end of 1749. His father, Henry Richards (died 1 July 1768, aged 59), was a farmer, who moved in 1758 to St. Clears, Carmarthenshire. He had only one year's schooling, in his twelfth year.

In 1768 he was admitted a member of the Particular Baptist congregation at Rhydwillim, Carmarthenshire. He became an occasional preacher at Salem Chapel, St. Clears, which had been projected by his father, and built in 1769. In 1773 he became a student in the Baptist dissenting academy at Bristol, under Hugh Evans (1712–1781). Leaving in September 1775, he acted as assistant to John Ash at Pershore, Worcestershire for about nine months.

On the recommendation of Hugh Evans, he was invited to an unsettled congregation in Broad Street, Lynn, Norfolk, and agreed to go for a year, from 7 July 1776. During this year he succeeded in healing divisions and organising his flock as a Baptist church; his settlement as regular pastor at Lynn dates from 1778. He declined a call to Norwich. He was an assiduous preacher, conducting three services each Sunday without notes. When absent on his visits to Wales, his place was taken by Timothy Durrant. In 1793 he received the diploma of M.A. from Brown University, Rhode Island, a Baptist foundation.

In September 1795 he left Lynn for Wales, being in poor health, and did not return until March 1798; he more than once tendered his resignation as pastor. He was again in Wales, during the whole of 1800 and 1801, and did not minister to his flock at Lynn after 1802, though the connection was never formally dissolved. He remained theoretically a close-communion Baptist, but abandoned Calvinism. While in South Wales he promoted an Arminian secession from Baptist churches, having relations with the new connexion of General Baptists. He has been claimed by the Unitarians, but held aloof from the Joseph Priestley school, and maintained Sabellian principles on the worship of Jesus Christ.

During a part of 1802 he conducted a morning service in the vacant Presbyterian chapel at Lynn. He was a strong advocate of slave emancipation, and was an honorary member of the Pennsylvania abolitionist society. In 1803 he married Emiah, the daughter of Welsh farmer. She died on 3 January 1805, aged 28.

Following the loss of his wife in 1805 he secluded himself for seven years. In 1811 his successor at Broad Street, Thomas Finch, was dismissed for anti-Calvinistic heresy, and Richards interested himself in the erection of a new building, Salem Chapel, opened (1811) on General Baptist principles, but he rarely preached there. The congregation became Unitarian, and later dispersed.

On 6 September 1818 Richards was admitted LL.D. by Brown University, but did not live to be aware of the honour. He died at Lynn on 13 September 1818 of angina pectoris, and was buried alongside his wife in the General Baptist Burial Ground at Wisbech. He bequeathed his library of 1300 volumes to Brown University, and left the rest of his property to his sister, Martha Evans.

== The History of Lynn ==
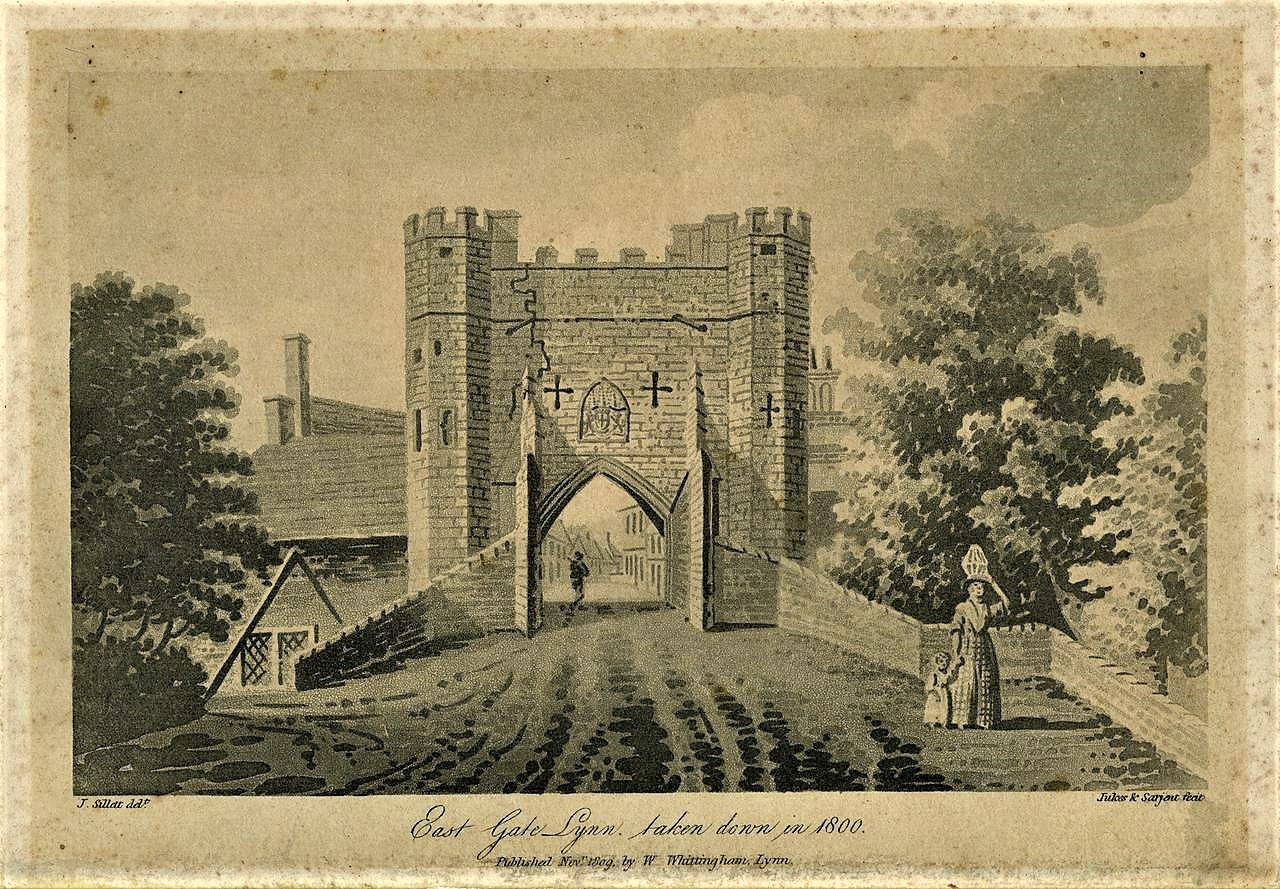
James Sillett, East Gate Lynn, taken down in 1800 (1809) from Richards' The History of Lynn, volume 2

In 1812 Richards published his best-known work, The History of Lynn, Civil, Ecclesiastical, Political, Commercial, Biographical, Municipal, and Military, from the earliest accounts to the present time … to which is prefixed … an introductory account of Marshland, Wisbech, and the Fens. It was published in the town, in two volumes, illustrated with aquatints after drawings by the Norfolk artist James Sillett. It tells the story of Lynn from Anglo-Saxon times until 1812, and the work is supplemented by biographical sketches, and by topographical and statistical information, with accounts of the religious houses formerly in Lynn, and of the progress of dissenting religion in the town. The collections of Guybon Goddard (d. 1677), the brother-in-law of Sir William Dugdale, freely used by Richards's predecessor, Benjamin Mackerell in his History of King's Lynn (1738), and by Charles Parkin in his Topography of Freebridge Hundred and Half, had been lost before Richards began writing, and he was denied free access to municipal records, so that his materials for the mediæval history of the town were limited.

== Other publications ==
In addition to pamphlets and single sermons, Richards also published

- Review of Mr. Carter's Strictures on Infant Baptism (Lynn, 1781).
- Observations on Infant Sprinkling (Lynn, 1781).
- The History of Antichrist, or Free Thoughts on the Corruptions of Christianity (Lynn, 1784; published in Welsh, as Llun Anghrist, Carmarthen, 1790)

These three publications were in controversy with John Carter, independent minister of Mattishall, Norfolk).

- Review of the Memoirs of the Protectorial House of Cromwell, by the Rev. Mark Noble, F. A. S.(Lynn, 1787).
- A Serious Discourse concerning Infant Baptism (Lynn, 1793).
- Reflections on French Atheism and English Christianity (1794)
- Food for a Fast-Day
- A Welsh-English Dictionary (1798); a companion English-Welsh dictionary was partly completed by Richards in manuscript, and an edition of both dictionaries was published at Carmarthen in 1828–32.
- A Word in Season, or a Plea for the Baptists(1804, in controversy with Isaac Allen, independent minister of Lynn).
- Address on the Duration or Perpetuity of Christian Baptism, with some Introductory Hints upon the Subjects and Mode of that Ordinance (1806).
- The Seasonable Monitor (Lynn, 1812–18; in seven parts).

The Welsh Nonconformists' Memorial; or, Cambro-British Biography, edited by John Evans, was published posthumously in 1820. A miscellaneous collection, much of it, including an account of Michael Servetus, had originally appeared in the Monthly Repository under the pseudonym "Gwilym Emlyn". To the Gentleman's Magazine for October 1789, he contributed a letter (dated 14 October 1789, and signed Gwilym Dyfed), supporting the story of the discovery of America by Madoc. He wrote for the three volumes of the Cambrian Register, 1796–1818.

== Notes and references ==
- Lee, Sidney, ed. (1896). "Richards, William (1749-1818)" . Dictionary of National Biography. Vol. 48. London: Smith, Elder & Co.
