= James Sillett =

English painter

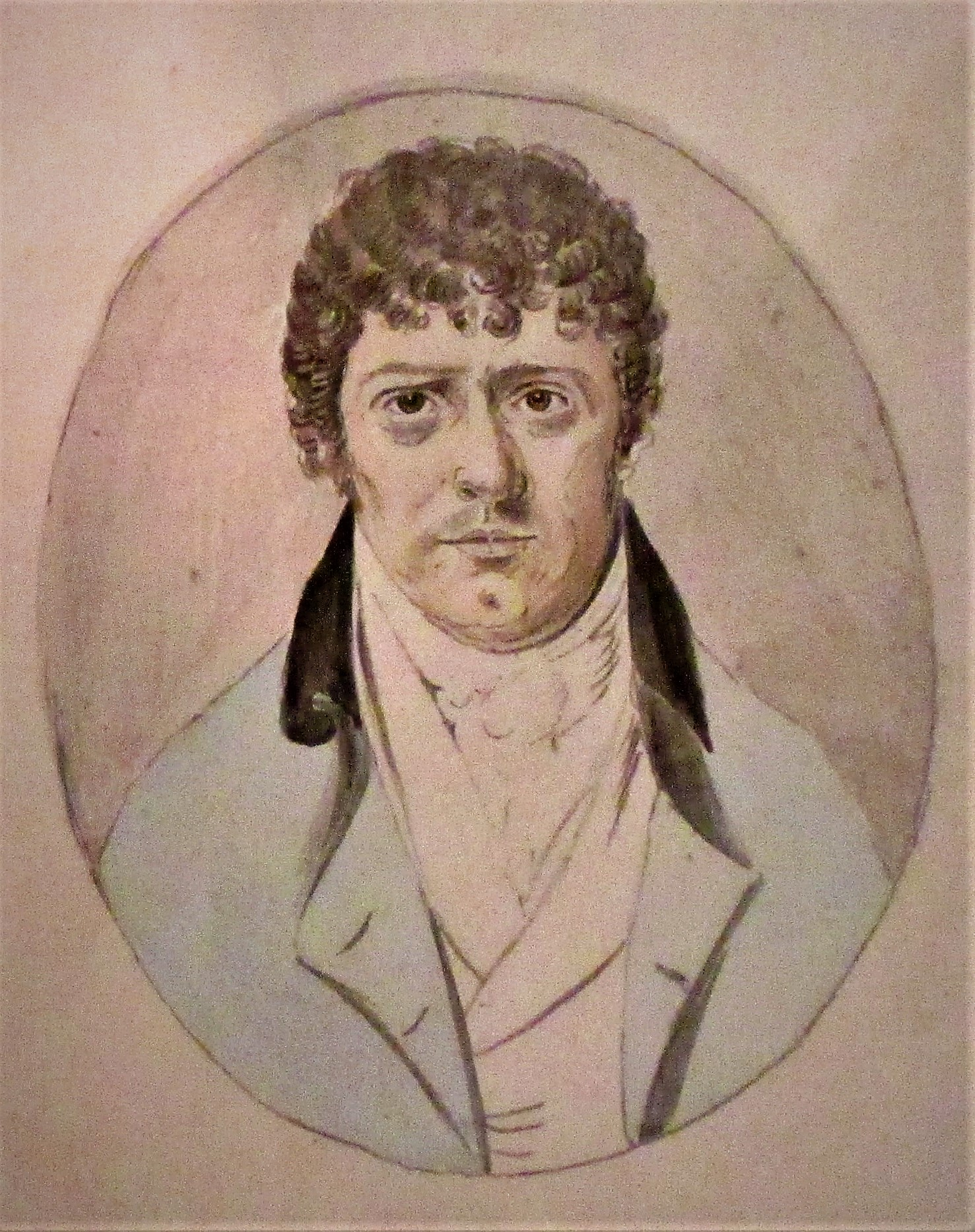
- Undated portrait
- Born: May 1764; Norwich
- Died: 6 May 1840 (aged 75–76); Norwich
- Resting place: Rosary Cemetery, Norwich
- Education: Royal Academy (disputed)
- Known for: Still life, topographical drawings of Norwich
- Movement: Norwich School of painters
- Spouse: Ann Banyard
- Elected: Norwich Society of Artists from 1806 (Vice-President 1814, President 1815)

James Sillett (before 16 May 1764 – 6 May 1840) was an English still life and landscape artist. He showed himself to be one of the most versatile of the Norwich School of painters: although the great majority of his works were still lifes and landscapes, he was also a drawing master and a miniaturist. His botanical paintings illustrations have been praised for their accuracy and attention to detail. These and his still life paintings are considered to be his best work, with some experts ranking him with William Jackson Hooker, whose illustrations were both accurate and charming. Sillett's own accurate depictions of plants were often used for book illustrations. His paintings often have an academic style, influenced by the masters of the eighteenth century in a way that set him apart from his Norwich contemporaries. He exhibited at the Royal Academy between 1796 and 1837.

Born and educated in Norwich, where he spent much of his career, Sillett initially worked as an apprentice to a Norwich heraldic painter before moving to London, where he was employed as a copyist by the Polygraphic Society. Together with the Norwich artist William Capon, he painted scenery at Drury Lane and Covent Garden. He claimed to have studied at the Royal Academy from 1787 to 1790, but evidence for this is lacking.

In 1801 he married Ann Banyard of East Dereham. In 1804 they returned from London to Norfolk to live in King's Lynn, where Sillett produced illustrations for Richards' History of Lynn. In 1811 he settled with his family in Norwich. There, he was elected as a member of the Norwich Society of Artists, becoming its vice-president in 1814 and its president the following year. He published A Grammar to Flower Painting, and Views of the Churches, Chapels and Other Public Edifices in the City of Norwich: his topographical drawings are regarded as an accurate and valuable record of much of the city's lost nineteenth century architecture. He died in 1840 and was buried in the city's Rosary Cemetery. His daughter Emma Sillett, who survived him, also painted flowers and was said to have been her father's greatest rival.

== Background ==
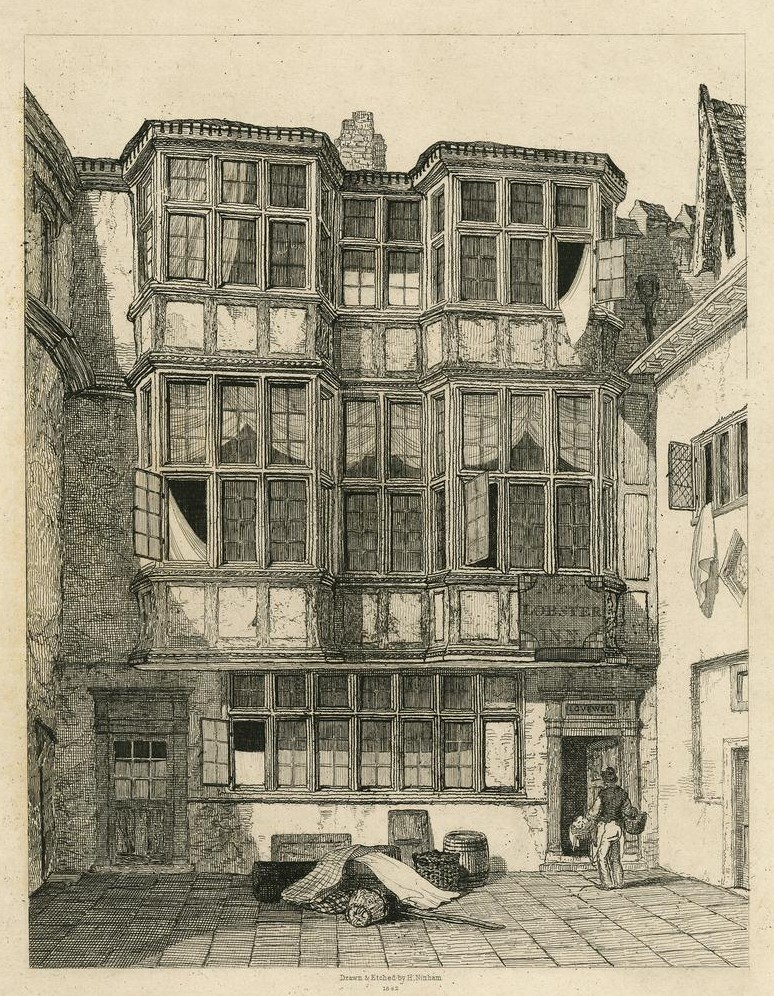
Ninham's etching of Sir Benjamin Wrenches Court

The Norwich School of painters, which included Sillett, was a group connected by geographical location, the depiction of Norwich and rural Norfolk, and by close personal and professional relationships. The school's most important artists were John Crome, Joseph Stannard, George Vincent, Robert Ladbrooke, James Stark, John Thirtle and John Sell Cotman. Norwich, the first English city outside London where such a school arose, had more local-born artists than anywhere outside the capital. Its theatrical, artistic, philosophical and musical cultures were cross-fertilised in a way that was unique for a provincial city.

The Norwich Society of Artists, which many members of the Norwich School belonged to, arose from the need for a group of Norfolk artists to teach each other and their pupils. Founded in 1803, it was key in establishing the artists' associations with each other. Its stated aims were "to conduct an Enquiry into the Rise, Progress and Present State of Painting, Archaeology and Sculpture with a view to point out the Best Methods of Study to attain to Greater Perfection in these Arts". It held regular exhibitions at Sir Benjamin Wrenches Court and elsewhere, and had an organised structure, showing works annually until 1825 and again from 1828 until its dissolution in 1833.

The leading spirits and the finest artists of the Norwich School of painters were Crome and Cotman. Interest in paintings by its artists declined during the 1830s, but the school's reputation rose after the Royal Academy's 1878 Winter Exhibition. However, by the end of the century, their works were seen by many as having belonged to a bygone age.

== Early life ==
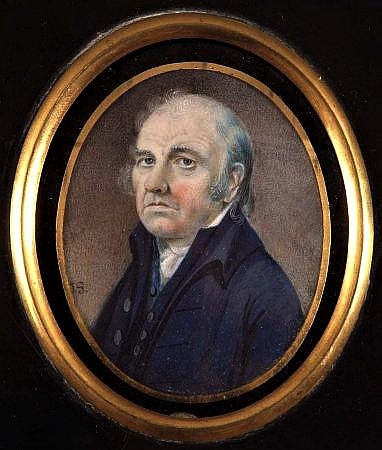
Sillett's miniature of his father (1799), Norfolk Museums Collections

James Sillett was born in Norwich and baptised in the city on 16 May 1764 at the church of St Martin at Oak. (Note: Sillett's name was also written as Sillet or Silleth.) The surname Sillett, which originated in Suffolk, is either a diminutive form of the Middle English personal name Sil, or alternatively a personal name derived from the Old English sǣliġ ('blessed') + hed ('person').

James was the son of James Sillett, who was born in 1733 in a village near the small Suffolk town of Eye, and his wife Mary Dobson, who was possibly from the south Norfolk village of Pulham St Mary. (Note: James Sillett and Mary Darby were married on 9 October 1730 at Tivetshall St Mary, north of Eye.) James and Mary Sillett were married on 16 January 1759 at St Augustine's Church, Norwich. Their other children included James (born 1760), John (born 1766) and Robert (born 1769).

Nothing about James' education or early childhood is known by the biographers of the Norwich School of painters, except that he attended Norwich Grammar School. After completing his education, Sillett worked in the city as an apprentice to a heraldic painter, and so his artistic career began in a similar way to those of his contemporaries Crome and John Ninham. Released from his apprenticeship, he moved to London. He was employed as a copyist by the Polygraphic Society, which had been established in 1784 by Joseph Booth and which held annual exhibitions of the paintings it reproduced. Sillett was forced to find employment elsewhere after a fire at the premises in 1793. (Note: Sillett wrote to the Monthly Magazine in 1808, explaining how the work of the Polygraphic Society was continued after the death of Joseph Booth. In his letter Sillett revealed that his employment there ceased following a disastrous fire at the works in February 1793, after which the company moved to the village of Walham Green (now part of the London borough of Hammersmith & Fulham).)

Sillett claimed in the Norwich Mercury to have studied in the schools of the Royal Academy from 1787 to 1790, but there is no evidence this is true, as his name was not included in any of the Academy's published lists of entrants.

== Artistic career ==
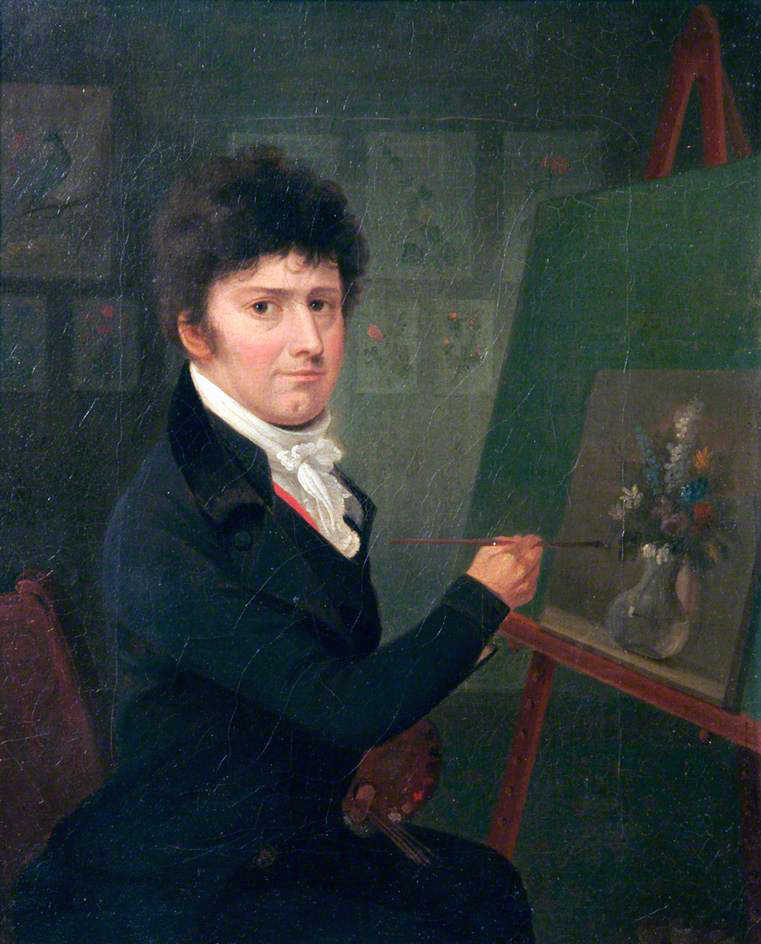
Self portrait (1803), oil on canvas, Norfolk Museums Collections

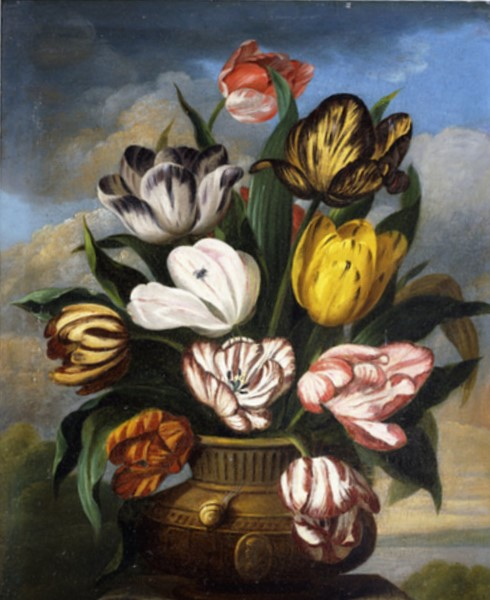
Tulips in a Vase, with a Caterpillar (undated)

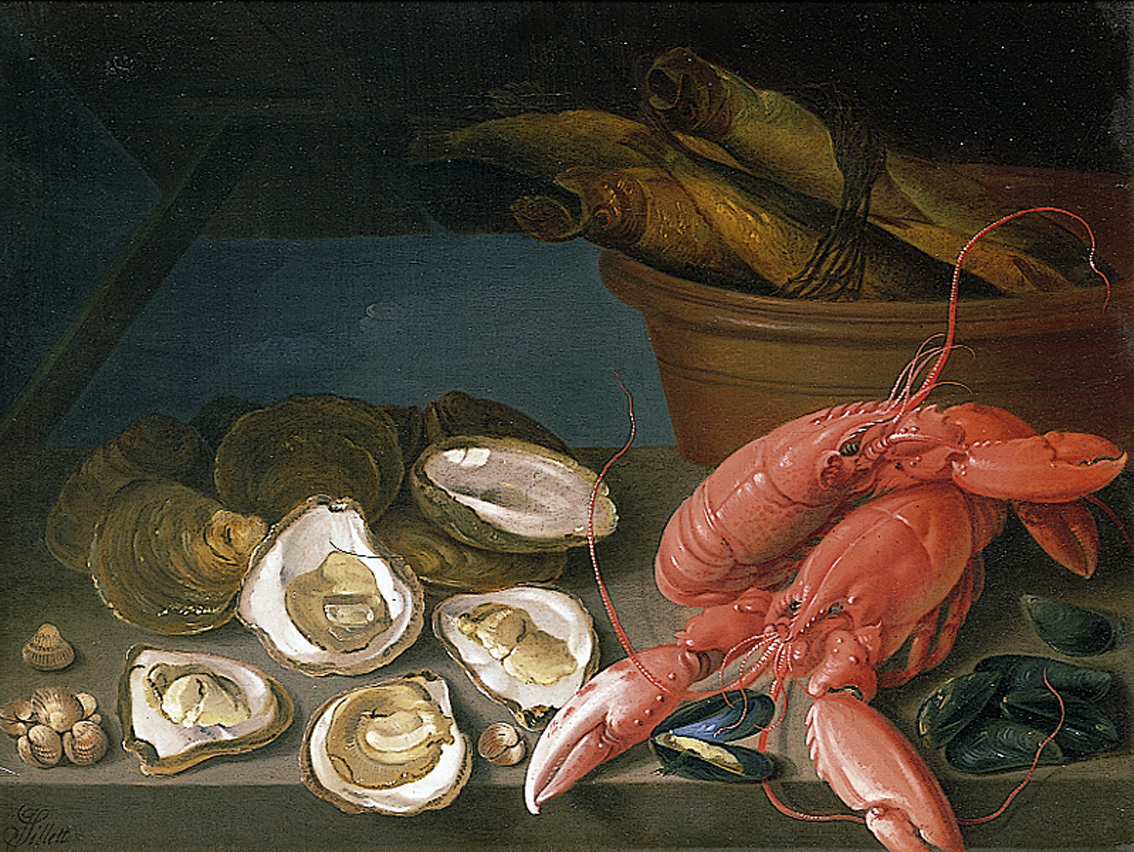
Still Life of Lobsters, etc (undated), oil on canvas

From the start of his artistic career, James Sillett showed himself to be one of the most versatile artists of the Norwich School of painters. He depicted landscapes, but tended towards a more academic style of landscape painting, which set him apart from his contemporaries. He became a good miniaturist, although G. C. Williamson in The History of Portrait Miniatures (1904) barely mentioned him, but noted that "his really notable work (was) scene painting, which he did for both Drury Lane and Covent Garden theatres". He painted game, fruit and flowers with considerable skill, often illustrating plants with a suggestion of the existence of a shadow, to give them a more three-dimensional appearance.

Of the 342 works he exhibited in total during his career, only sixteen were not still lifes of plants or animals. He venerated the traditions of 18th century painters and paintings, which influenced his own works: the paintings he showed at Somerset House show clearly that at one time he studied the Dutch still life painter Jan van Os. His landscape paintings were produced on wood panel or canvas, and were sometimes engraved.

Sillett exhibited at the Royal Academy for over forty years, between 1796 and 1837. Whilst in London it is thought that he was involved in painting scenery at Drury Lane and Royal Italian Opera at Covent Garden, along with the Norwich artist William Capon. In 1796 his address was given as 12, Mansfield Place, St. Georges Fields, London: by 1798 he had moved to 16, Charles Street, Covent Garden. After 1798 his address is given as Norwich or King's Lynn, sometimes with alternative London addresses provided.

For most of his working life Sillett taught drawing, advertising in the local press as an artist and drawing master. In 1804 he moved to King's Lynn to be closer to his wife's relatives, advertising as "Professor of Painting, Oil and Water Colours, and Drawing Master". He taught drawing from his house on Norfolk Street but still maintained an artistic output, exhibiting some two hundred works at Mr Lockett's Coffee House in King's Lynn Market Place in January 1808. He produced illustrations for the second volume of William Richards' History of Lynn, published in 1812. He also made watercolour drawings of church monuments such as the font in St Peter Mancroft in Norwich.

== Later years ==
In 1811 Sillett moved with his family back to Norwich, which he made his permanent home. A member of the Norwich Society of Artists from 1806, he became Vice-President of the Society in 1814, and President in 1815. He was one of the artists who along with Ladbrooke and Thirtle seceded from the Society in 1816, forming a new group known as the Norfolk and Norwich Society of Artists. In a barely concealed dig at John Crome (and thus at the old Society), Sillett wrote, "There is more beauty in the delineation of flowers from the garden and human figure rather than pig stys [sic] and cart sheds ..." Along with other members of the group, he showed his works at its exhibitions for three years before it was disbanded. He then returned to the original group and exhibited there until 1833.

Although highly regarded as a painter during his life time, rivalry between local drawing masters caused him to write to the Norwich Mercury in 1817, in order to emphasise that his teaching "is by no means confined to Fruit, Flowers, &, as has been intimated".

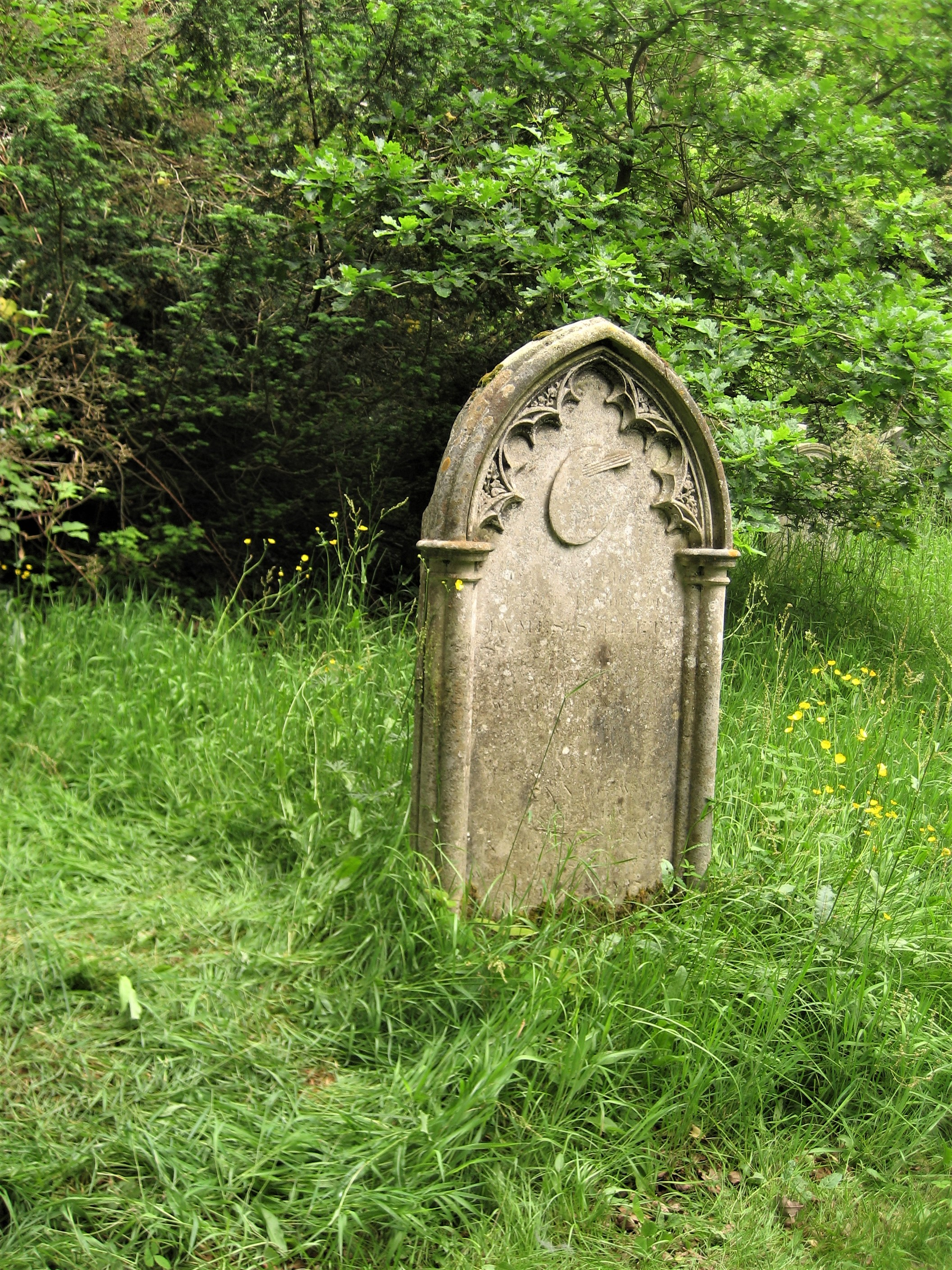
James and Ann Sillett's grave in the Rosary Cemetery, Norwich

In 1818 Sillett is recorded as living in the centre of Norwich on the "west side of City Ditches". In 1826 he published his own Grammar to Flower Painting; : being a concise, plain, and easy method for amateurs to attain the rudiments of the science without the help of a master.

In 1828 he published a set of fifty-nine views of Norwich buildings. The publication, Views of the Churches, Chapels and Other Public Edifices in the City of Norwich, was a set of fifty-nine lithographs, and was one of the few lithographic major projects produced by the Norwich School of painters after the use of the new medium spread rapidly during the 1820s. His original intention was for his engravings, made from his original watercolours, to have been published in instalments and sold by subscription, but eight years after this intention was first announced in the local press, the engravings were published together. The engravings, which almost definitely were produced in response to Ladbrooke's Views of the Churches of Norfolk, accurately depict the important buildings of Norwich.

Sillett may have travelled to Rotterdam and Leiden, which he depicted in several landscapes.

In later life he ceased to have any influence on the more forward-looking artists of the Norwich School of painters. He was quoted when an old man as saying "Existence would no longer be desirable when deprived of the use of my pencil". He is said to have been at work six hours before he died at his home in Norwich on 6 May 1840. He was buried in the Rosary Cemetery, a short distance from the city: an artist's palette can be seen at the top of his headstone .. His obituary was published in the Norfolk Chronicle. (Note: "Died, aged 76, Mr. James Sillett, of King Street, Norwich. “As an artist he stood unrivalled in his minute and accurate delineations of fish, fruit, and flowers. From 1781 to 1790 he studied from the figure at the Royal Academy, under Professors Reynolds, Barry, and others, whose lectures he also attended. He began to exhibit at Somerset House in 1796, which he continued at intervals for upwards of 30 years, part of which time he practised as a miniature painter with great success. He afterwards settled in his native city, and gained pre-eminence in his skilful and faithful delineations in oil and water colours. In later days he undertook architectural subjects. In 1815 he was President of the Norwich Artists’ Society, of which he was one of the original members, but, in consequence of disputes arising, he and two other of the original members quitted it. He continued annually to exhibit, although he never afterwards joined the society, which, from want of encouragement, gradually dissolved in a few years.") In his will, dated 31 July 1839, he left his family £300.

== Family ==
In 1801 he married Ann Banyard of East Dereham, through whom he became possessed of some property.

Of their five children, three died in infancy. Their daughter Emma became well known as a flower-painter, and also painted animals, fruit and shells. Emma Sillett and her father were the only contemporaries of Emily Stannard who could rival her. Her artistic ability enabled her to assist her father in her teaching from 1817, but little else is known of her life or artistic career. Her brother James Banyard Sillett (born in 1809) did not follow his father's profession but became a languages teacher. Emma and James Banyard lived together in Norfolk: Emma died unmarried on 27 January 1880 at the age of seventy-seven, and her brother died unmarried aged ninety.

== Reputation ==
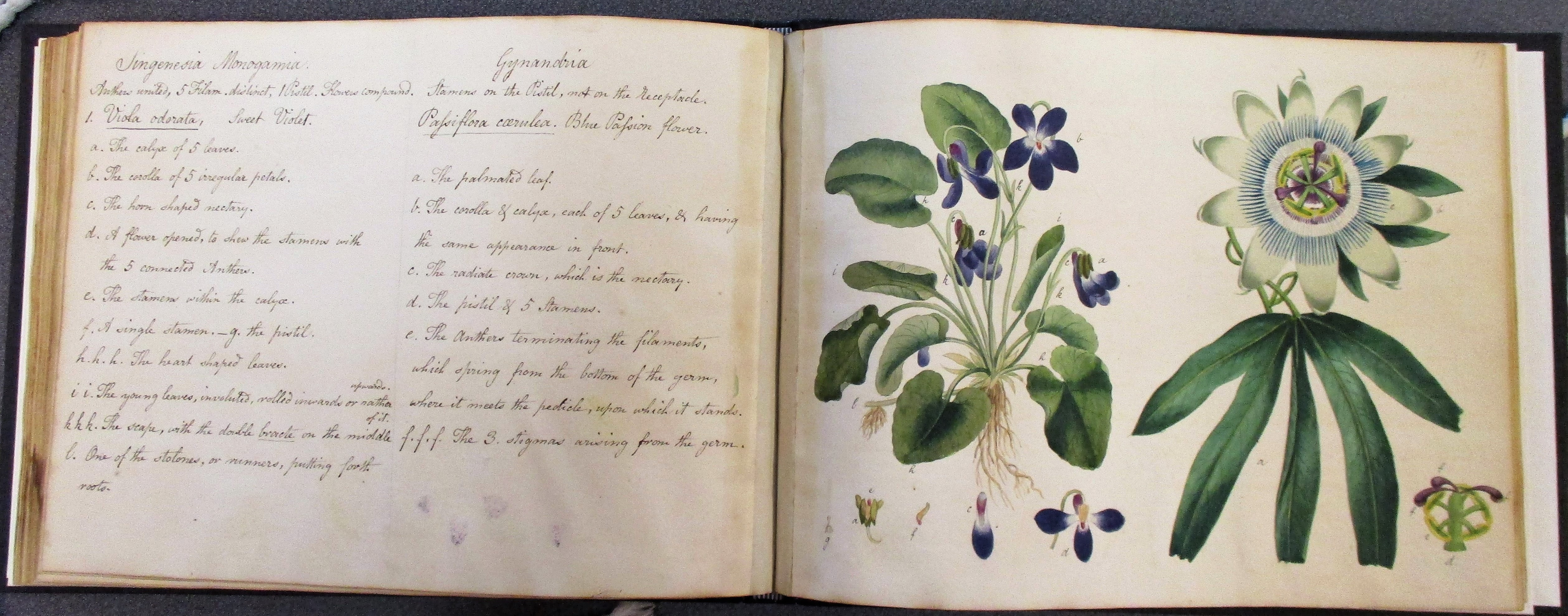
Sillett's illustrations and accompanying text for the sweet violet (Viola odorata] and the blue passionflower (Passiflora caerulea) in An easy introduction to drawing flowers according to nature (1806).

Sillett has generally received praise from art critics and historians. The historian William Dickes, writing in 1905, described Sillett as a careful artist and a technically skilled draughtsman. Sillett's still life paintings are considered to be his best work, in both watercolour and oils. According to the art historian Josephine Walpole, some experts rank him with William Jackson Hooker, an artist who was able to combine accuracy with charm. Sillett's botanical paintings, which were often used for book illustrations, show great skill in depicting transparency in petals.

The art historian Derek Clifford, writing in the 1960s, also reserved his praise for Sillett's still life works, noting that only one landscape painting, The Old Oak at Winfarthing (1817), which the historian Josephine Walpole describes as his best known work, has a similar delicacy of touch.

Walpole, who finds his watercolours more appealing than his monochrome topographical studies of churches, has noted that his landscapes are usually rather small in size. Sillett's still lifes, which were produced in both watercolour and oil, are praised by Walpole for being highly finished although stylistic, with large carefully depicted flower heads placed in characteristically small vases. According to Walpole, his 1803 watercolour Garden Mallows, now kept in the British Museum, skilfully achieved the desired effect of showing petals that are both strongly coloured and virtually transparent.

According to the author Harold Day, Sillett was considered by his peers to have great integrity. He described Sillett's early landscapes as characteristically primitive and displaying "a delightful ability to handle paint", noting his mastery of tone and the beautifully depicted skies in his moonlit scenes. Day compared Sillett's copper engravings and depictions of figures with those of John Crome, whose influence is discernible, as well as reserving praise for his paintings of flowers, describing them as being "of good colour, carefully drawn and well composed". Though not of outstanding artistic quality, they are important for modern historians, as the appearance of many buildings Sillett drew has altered substantially since the 1820s, and other buildings have since been demolished. Clifford, who considered Sillett as being multi-talented, has described them as having a "pleasantly sensitive simplicity".

His works now sell in his home country and in the United States for high prices: with his oil painting Auricula Primrose fetching £32,200 at auction in 1996. His 1830 Still-life with Peaches, Apples, Grapes, Plums, Cherries and Gooseberries in a Dish with Hazelnuts and a Snail on a Ledge (54 x 66.3 cm), which was sold in London in 1993, fetched £8,625. The oil painting Kings Lynn, Norwich and Lynn Stagecoach with Figures and Children (35 x 26 cm) was sold at auction in Hazlemere in 2016, for £5,200. Admiral, Earl Nelson realised £9,650 in September 2004.

== Galleries ==
=== Still lifes and botanical illustrations ===
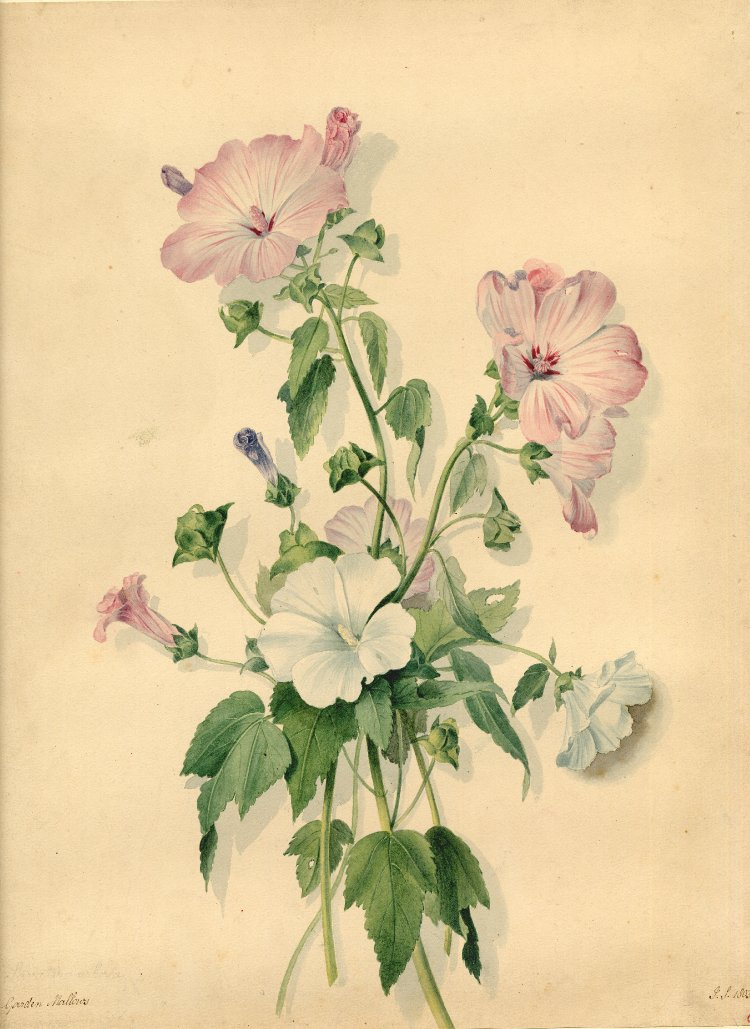
Garden Mallows (1803), watercolour on paper, British Museum

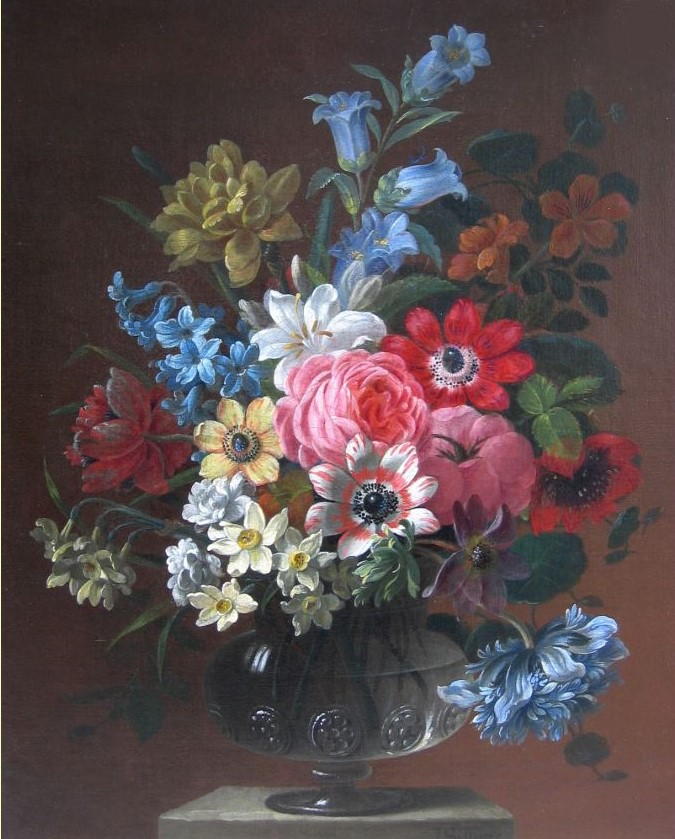
A Still Life of Roses, Narcissi, Delphiniums and other Flowers in a glass Vase on a ledge (undated), oil on canvas

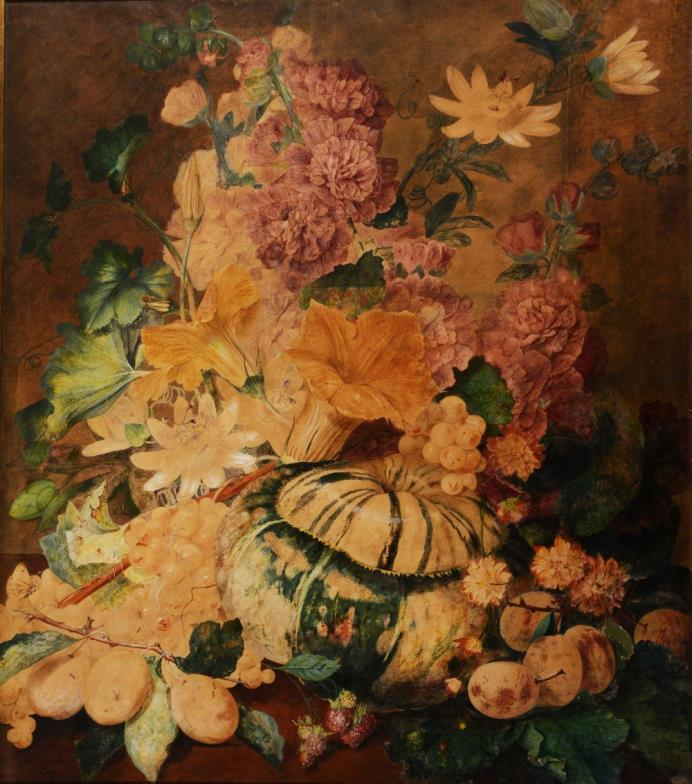
Still life, an abundance of flowers and fruit (undated), watercolour on paper

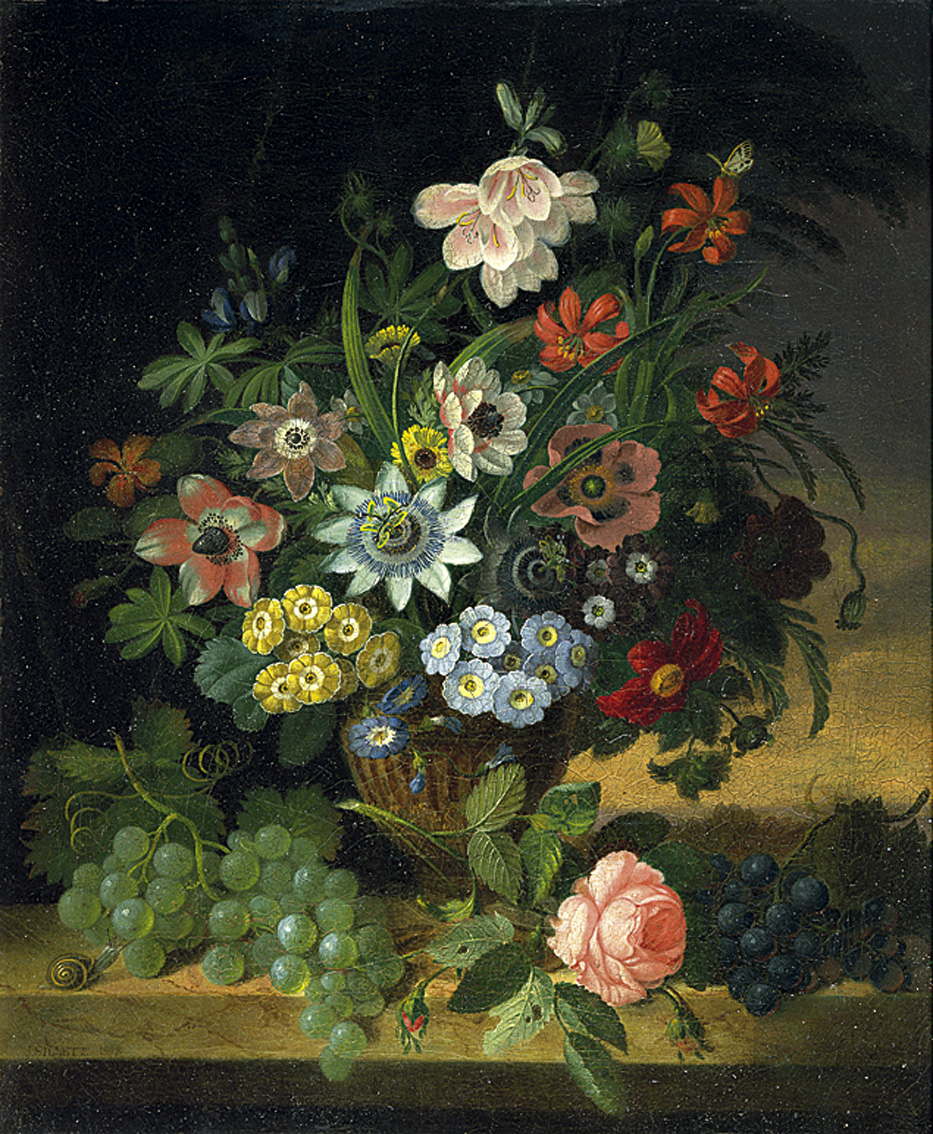
Flowers and Fruit (1827), oil on canvas, Norfolk Museums Collections

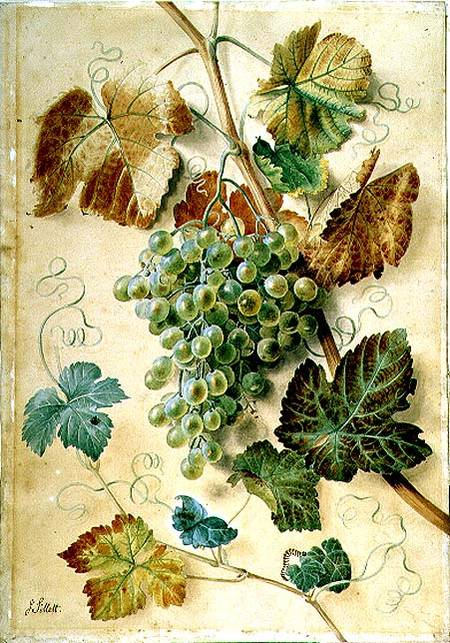
White Grapes (undated), watercolour on paper, Norfolk Museums Collections

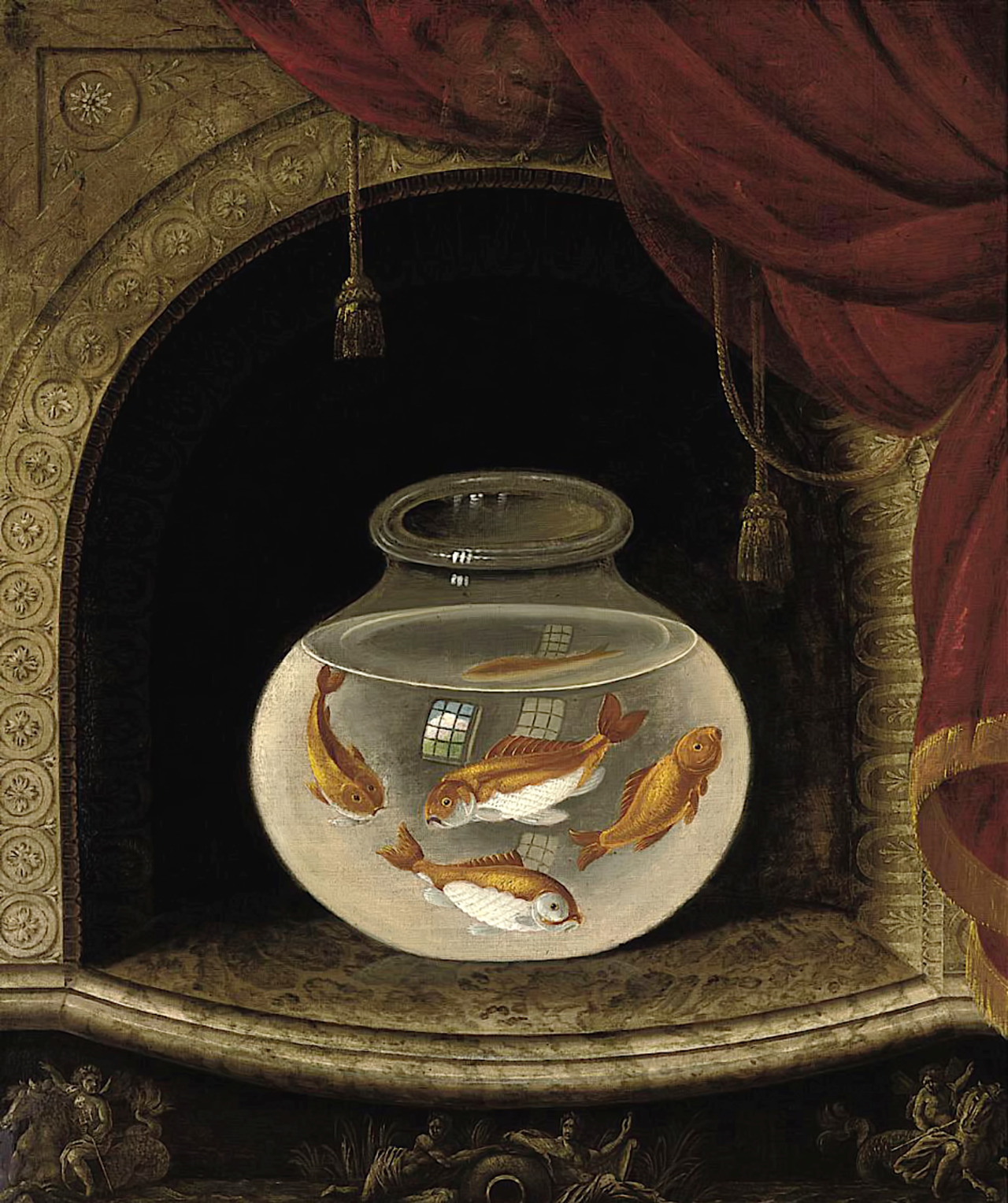
Goldfish (undated)

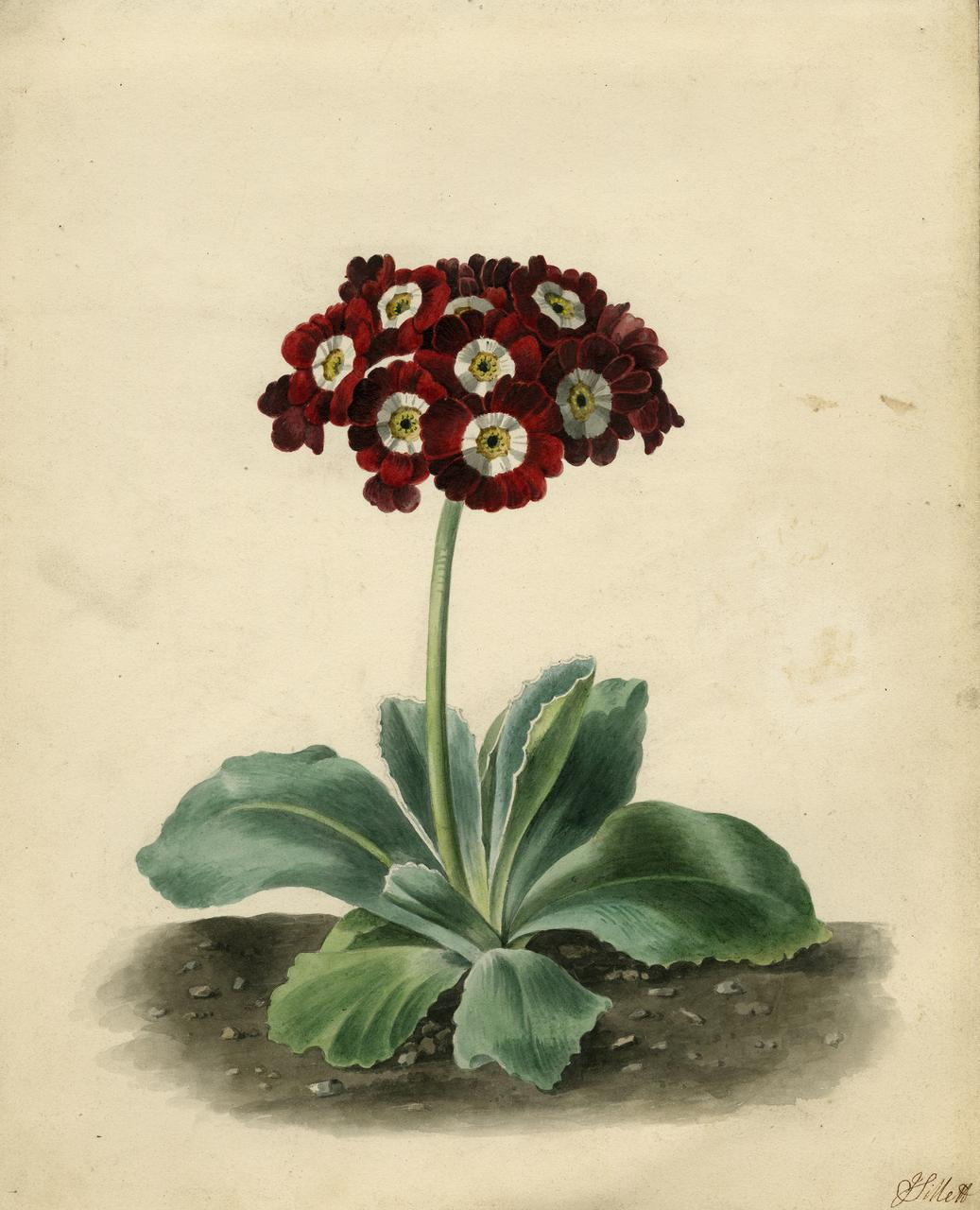
Merry's Pompadour Auricula (undated), pencil and watercolour (with gum arabic) on paper, Norfolk Museums Collections

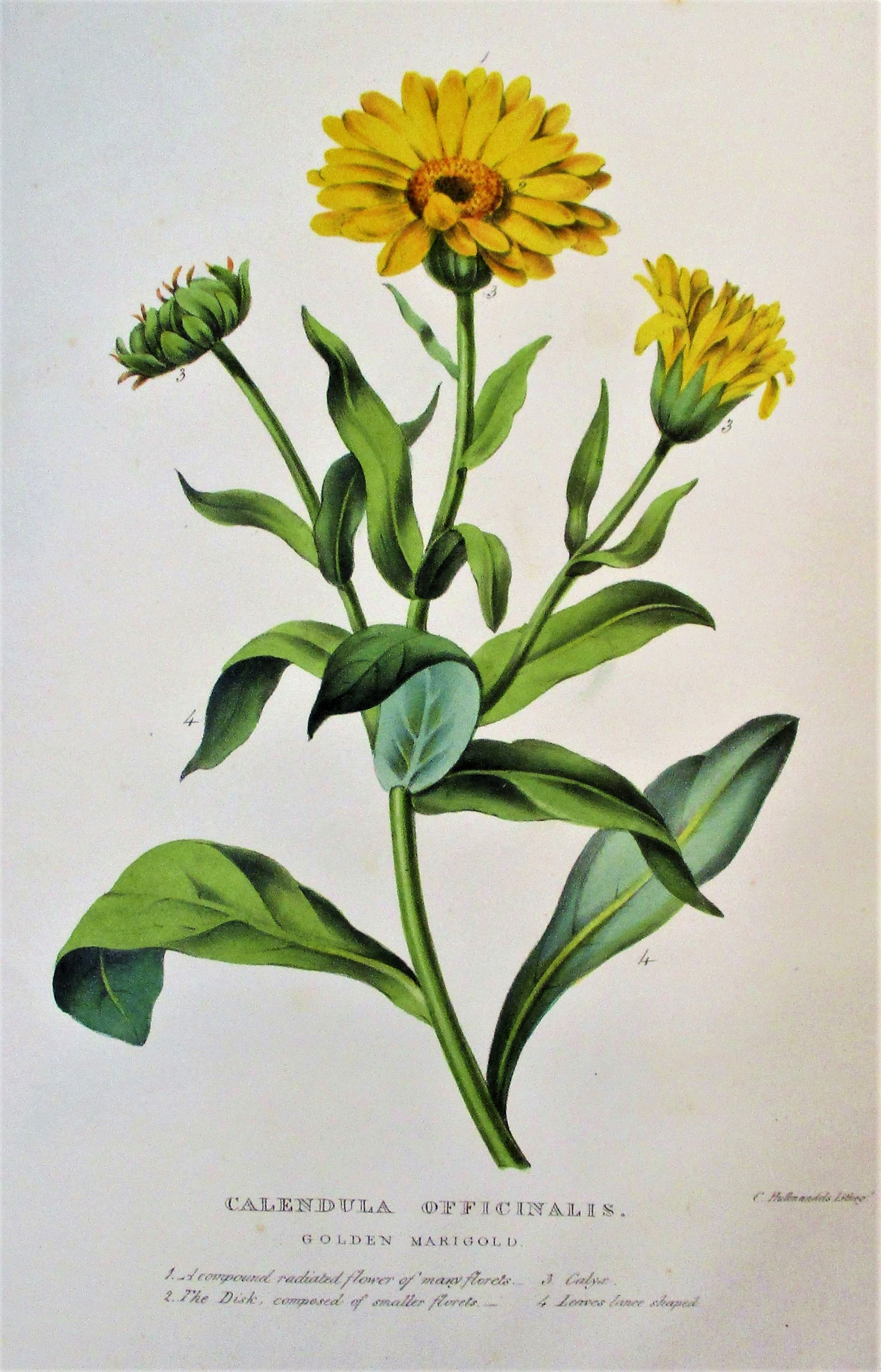
Golden Marigold, from Grammar to flower-painting (1826)

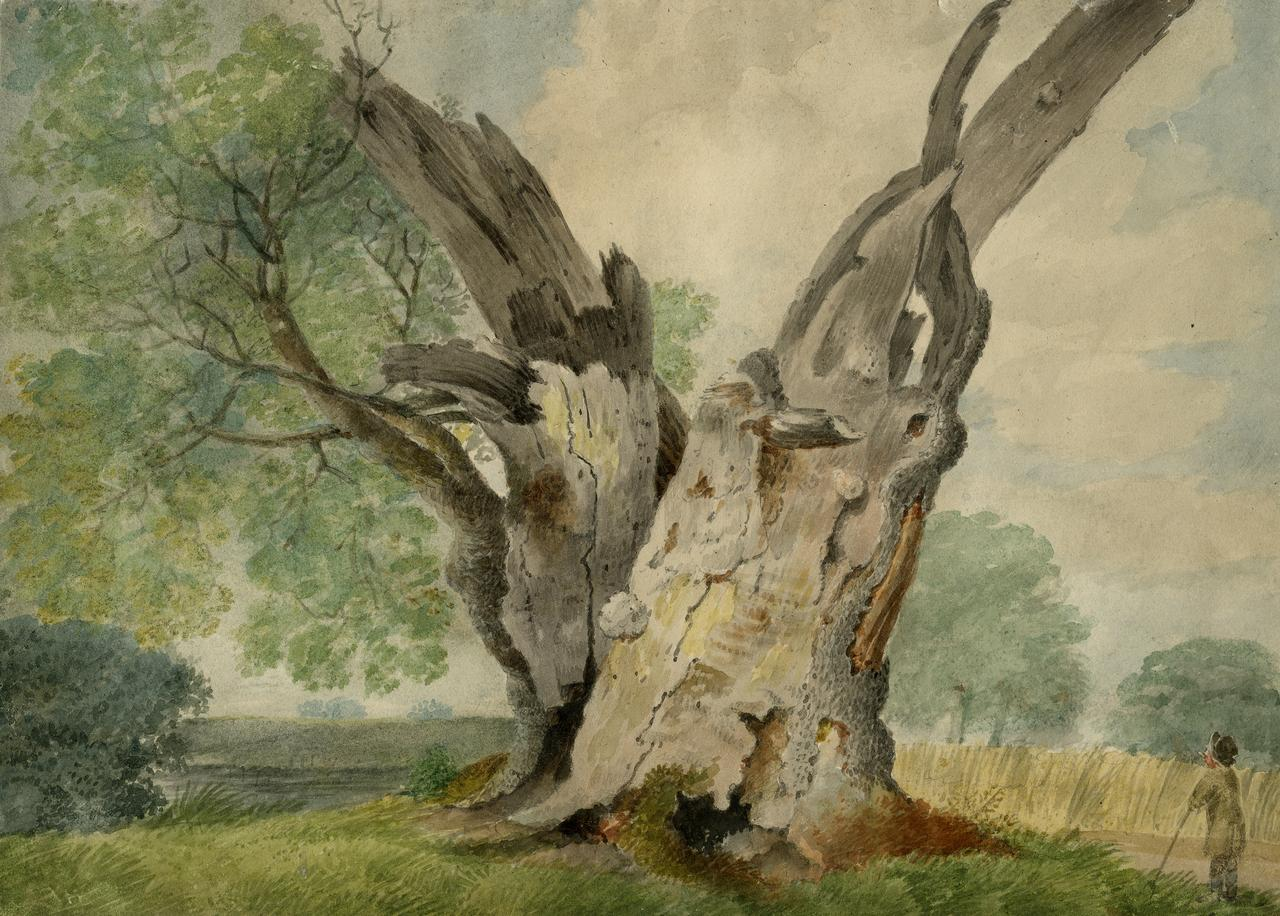
The Old Oak at Winfarthing (1817), watercolour over pencil on paper, Norfolk Museums Collections. Sillett made two oil paintings of the same tree in 1812 and 1817.

=== Landscapes and buildings ===
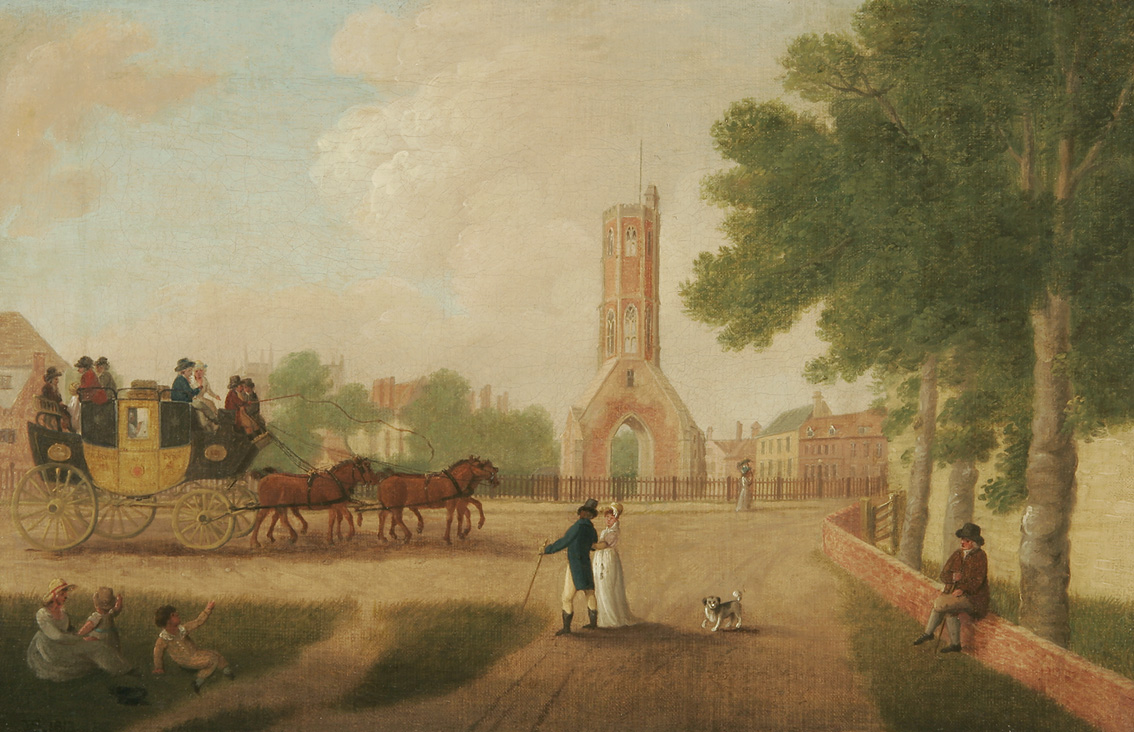
Norwich Stagecoach at King's Lynn (undated), oil on canvas, Norfolk Museums Collections

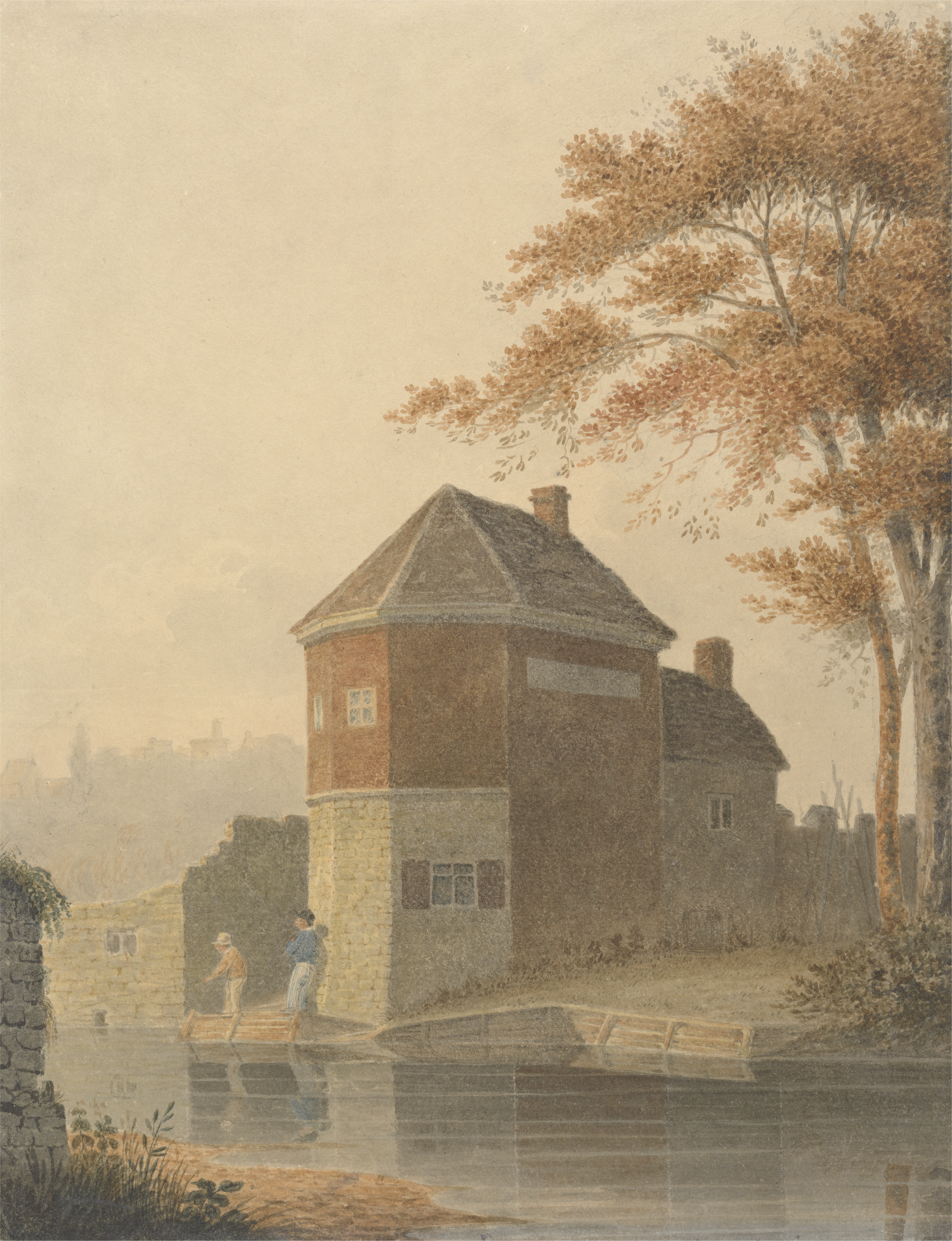
Pockthorpe, Norwich (undated), watercolour and graphite over black ink on wove paper, Yale Center for British Art

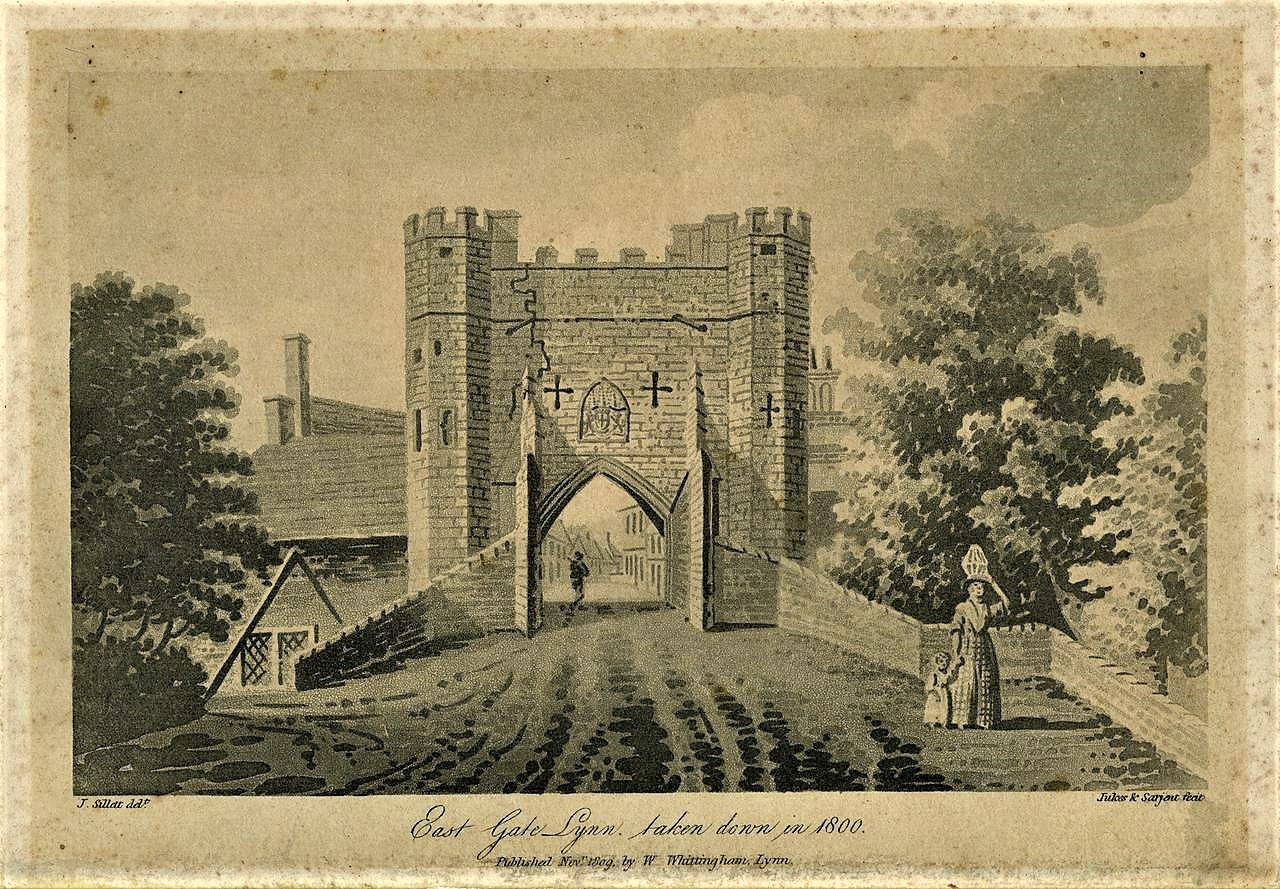
East Gate Lynn, taken down in 1800 (1809) from Richards' The History of Lynn, volume 2, Norfolk Museums Collections

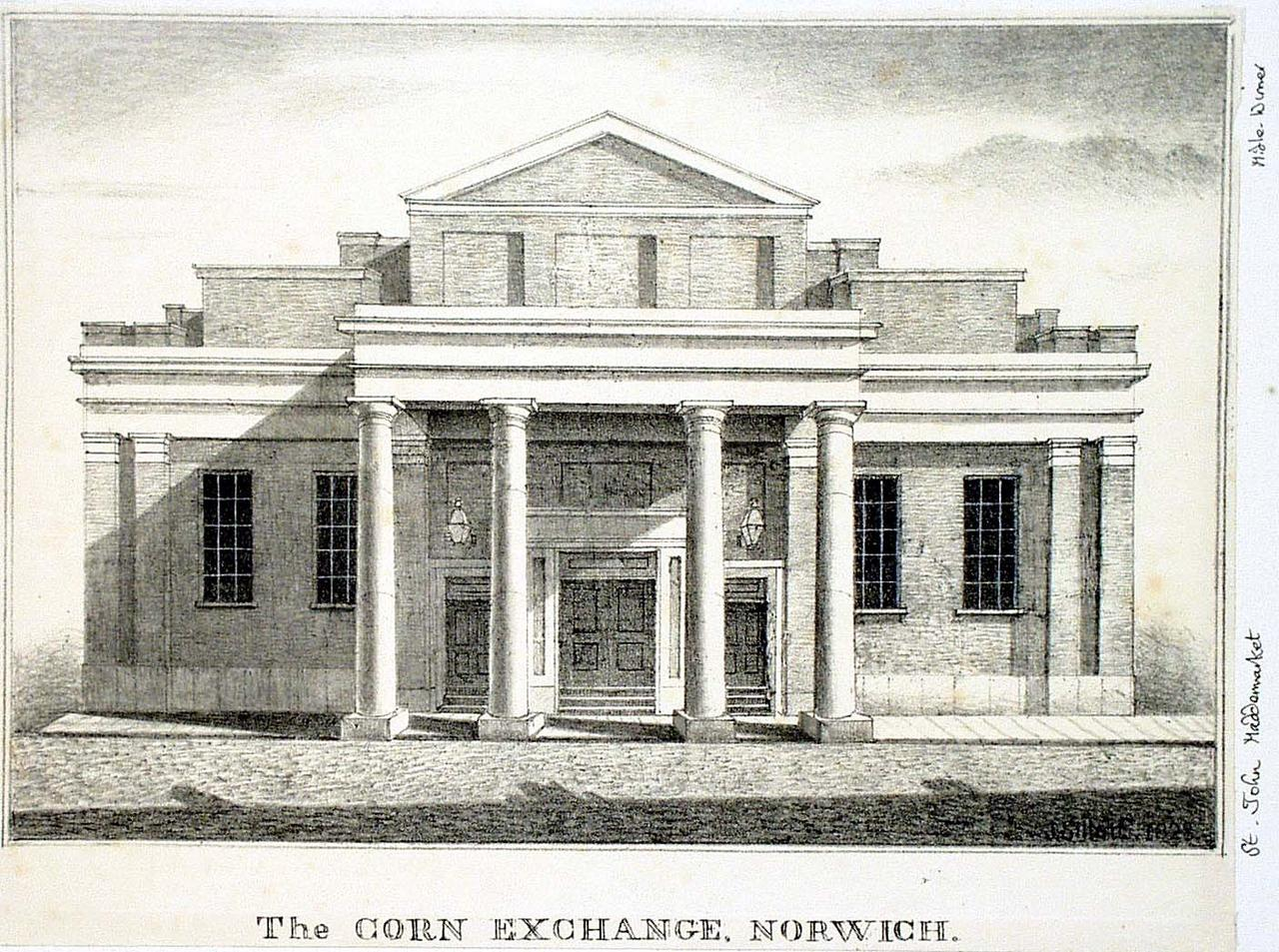
The Corn Exchange, Norwich (1828), Norfolk Museums Collections

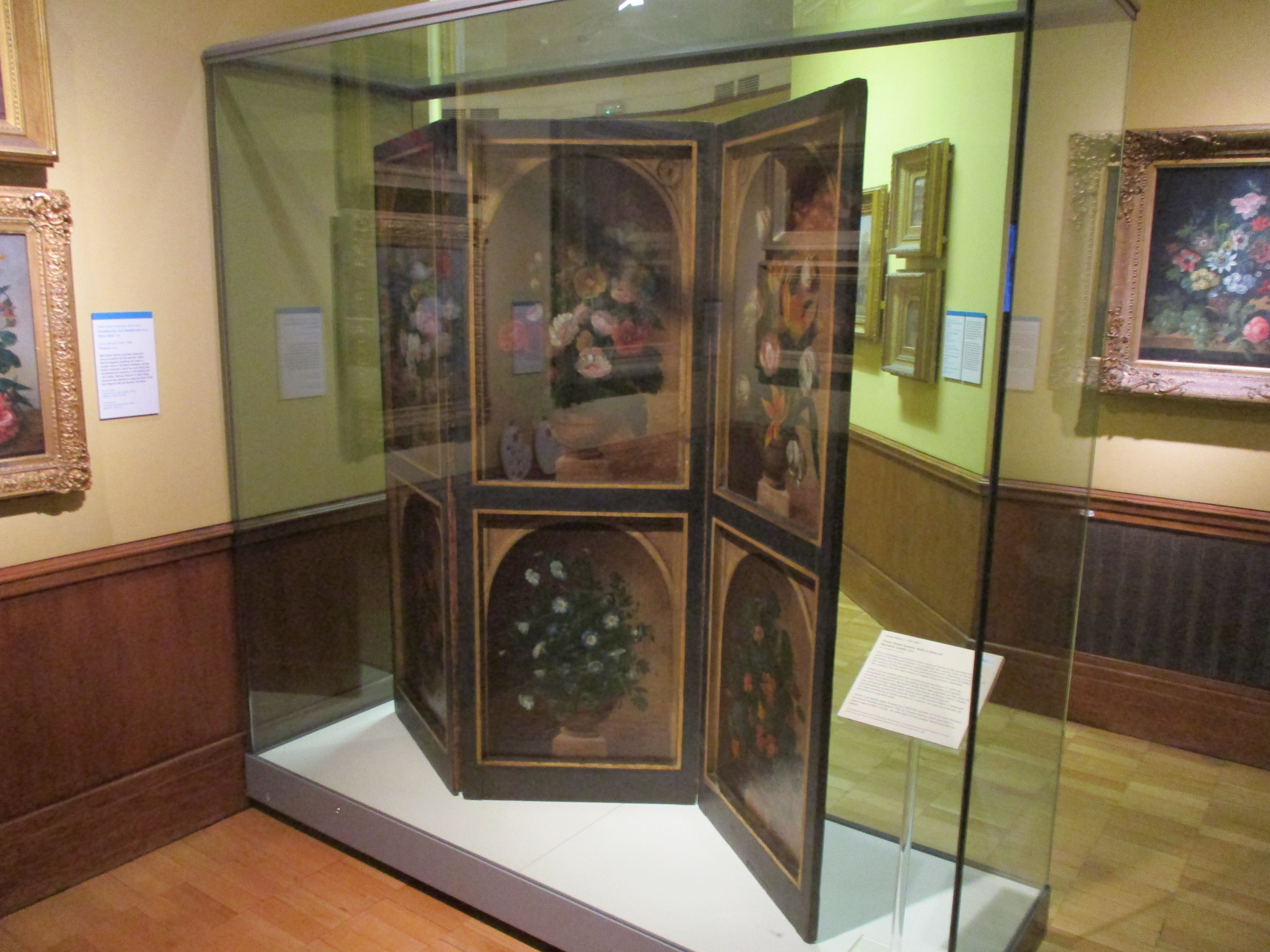
Three Panel Screen (1838), Norfolk Museums Collections. Painted by Sillett, possibly for use in his house on Upper King Street, Norwich. Oil and canvas on paper.

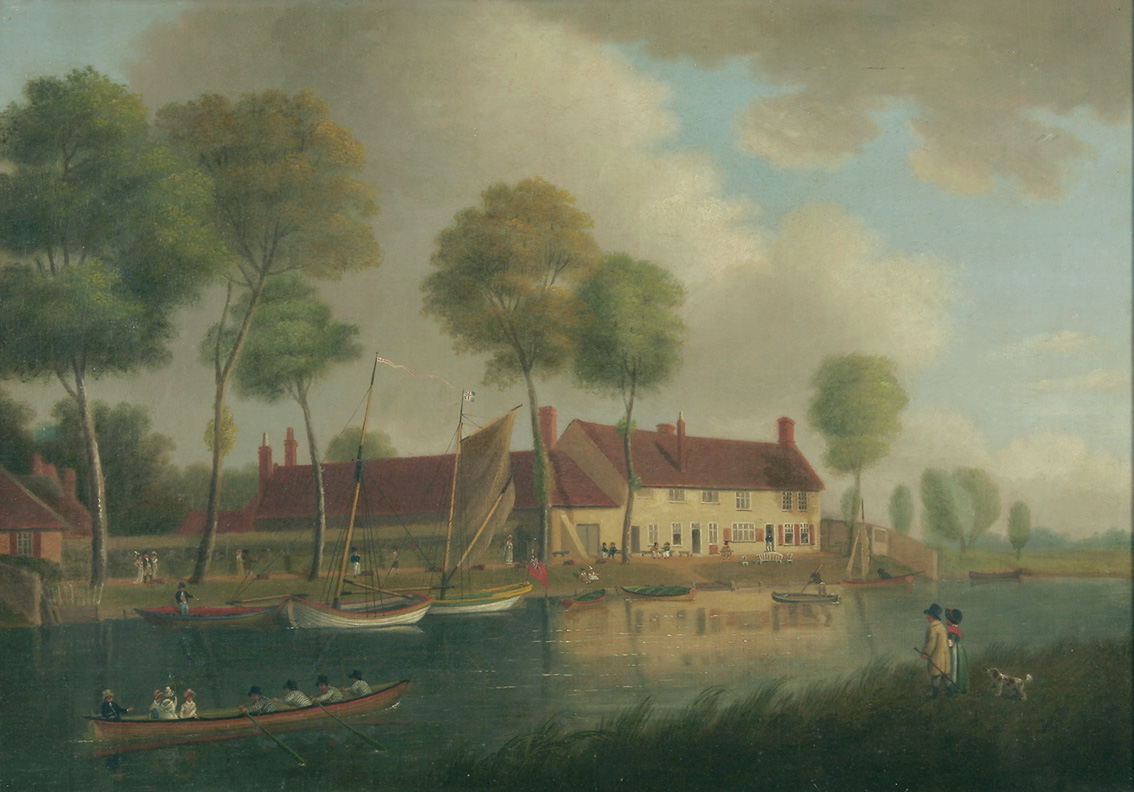
Thorpe Gardens Public House, Norwich (1818), oil on canvas, Norfolk Museums Collections

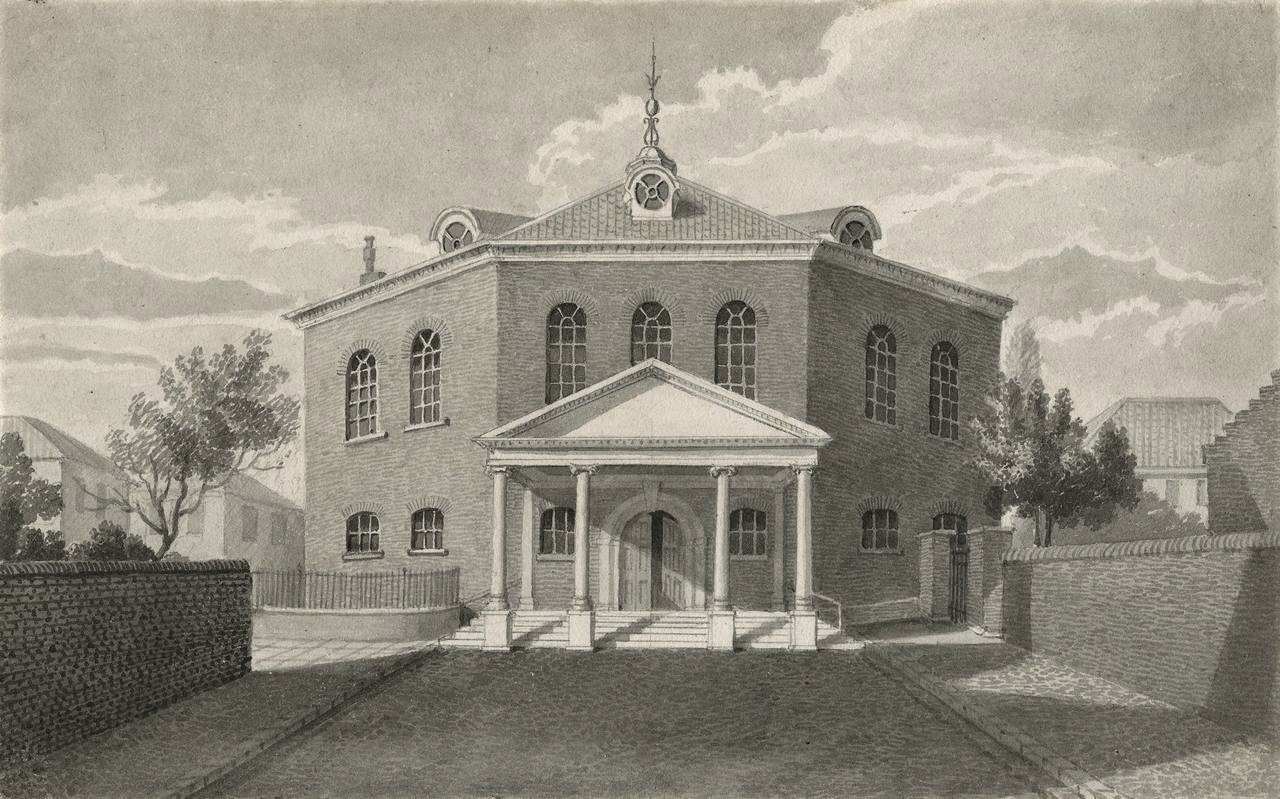
The Octagon Chapel, Norwich (undated), print, Norfolk Museums Collections

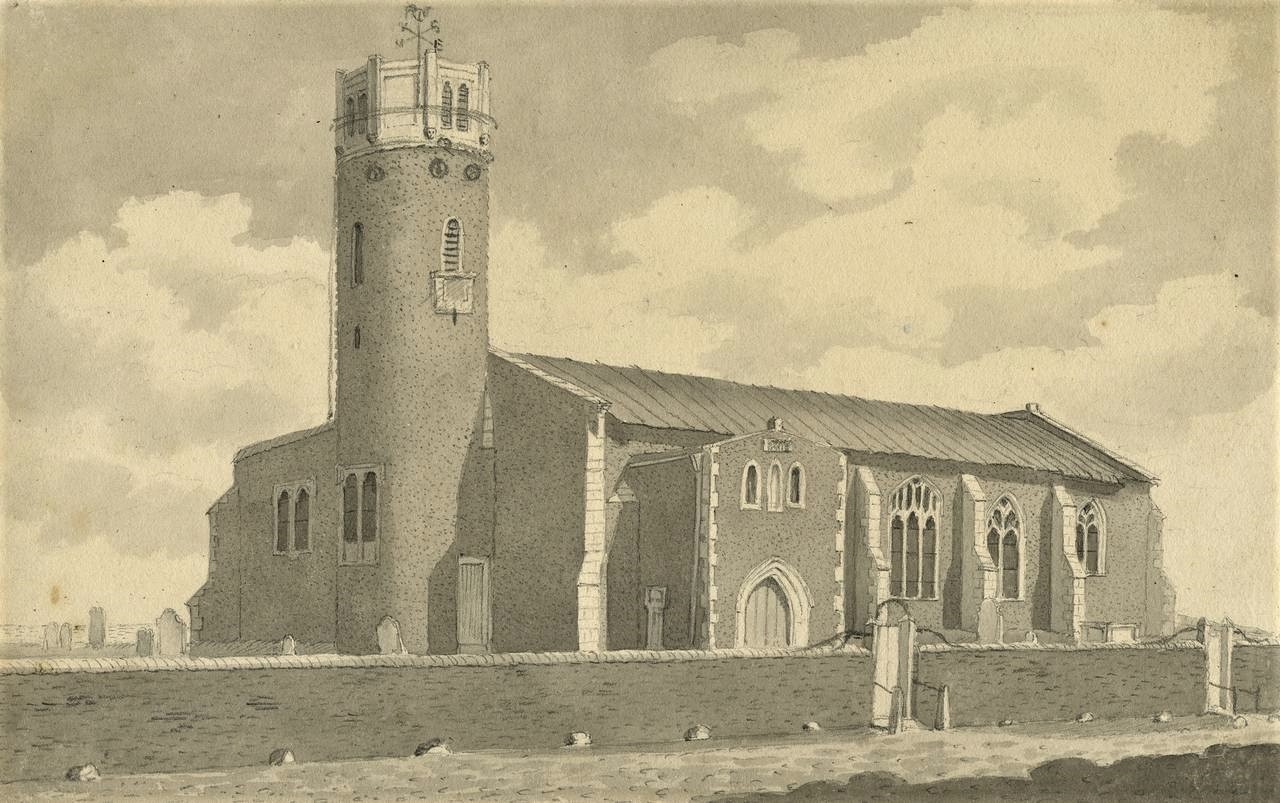
St Paul Fyebridge Church, Norwich (c. 1815), pencil and grey wash on paper, Norfolk Museums Collections

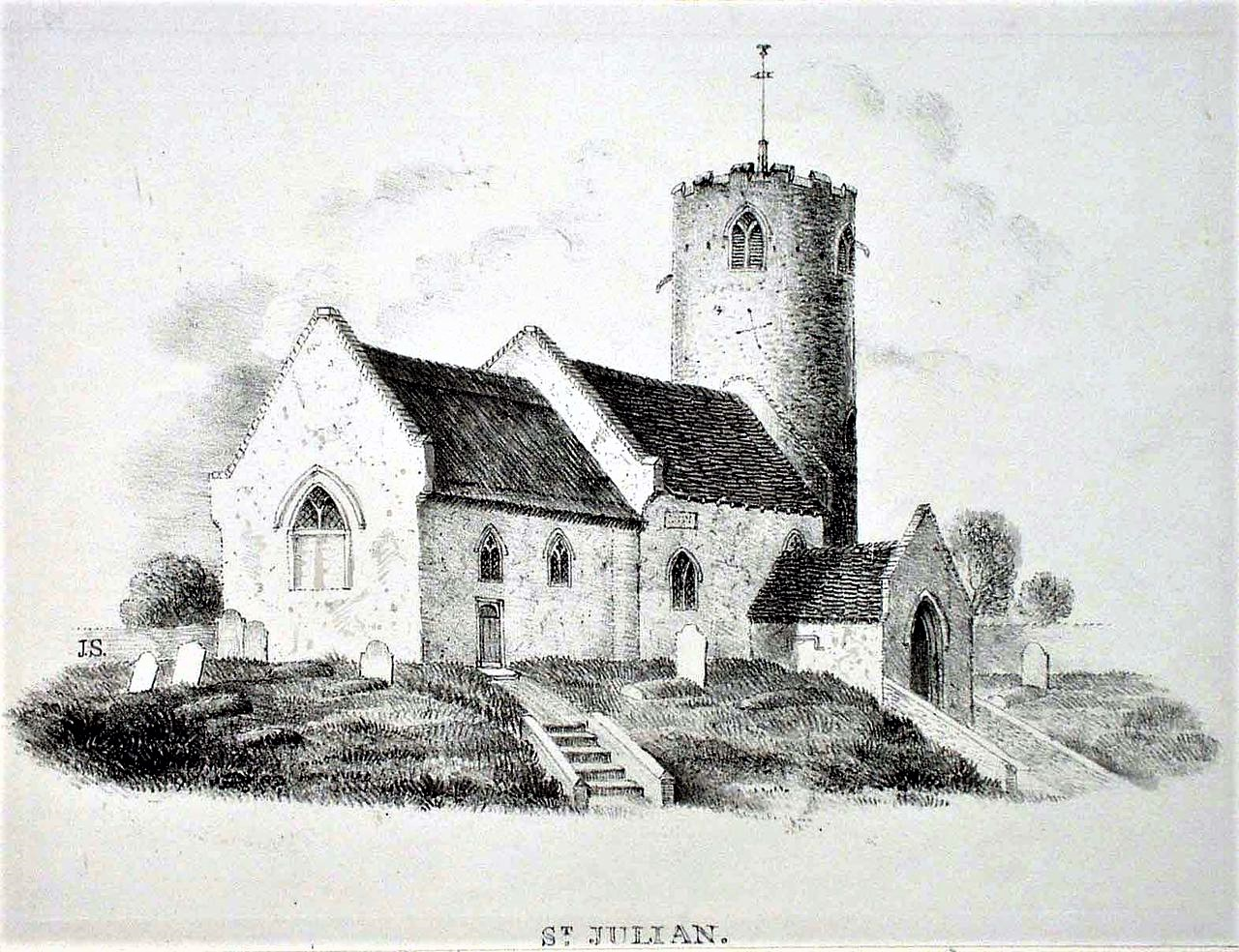
St Julian's Church Norwich, an engraving from Sillett's Views of the Churches, Chapels and Other Public Edifices in the City of Norwich (1828), Norfolk Museums Collections

== Bibliography ==
This article incorporates text from a publication now in the public domain: "Sillett, James". Dictionary of National Biography. London: Smith, Elder & Co. 1885–1900.

- Bryan, Michael (1905). Bryan's Dictionary of Painters and Engravers. Vol. 5. London: George Bell and Sons. OCLC 1281916.
- Bury, Stephen, ed. (2012). Benezit Dictionary of British Graphic Artists and Illustrators. Vol. 1. Oxford University Press. ISBN 978-0-19-992305-2.
- Clifford, Derek (1965). Watercolours of the Norwich School. Cory, Adams & Mackay. OCLC 835085249.
- Cundall, Herbert Minton (1920). The Norwich School. London: Geoffrey Holme Ltd. OCLC 1356134.
- Day, Harold (1968). East Anglian Painters. Vol. II Norwich School. Eastbourne, UK: Eastbourne Fine Art. ISBN 978-0-902010-00-0.
- Dickes, William Frederick (1905). The Norwich school of painting: being a full account of the Norwich exhibitions, the lives of the painters, the lists of their respective exhibits and descriptions of the pictures. Norwich: Jarrold & Sons Ltd. OCLC 192940599.
- Graves, Algernon (1895). A dictionary of artists who have exhibited works in the principal London exhibitions from 1760 to 1893. London: H. Graves. OCLC 255731585.
- Fiske, Tina (2007). "Sillett, James". Oxford Dictionary of National Biography (online ed.). Oxford University Press. doi:10.1093/ref:odnb/25548. (Subscription, Wikipedia Library access or UK public library membership required.)
- Fawcett, Trevor (1974). The rise of English provincial art: artists, patrons, and institutions outside London, 1800-1830. Oxford: Clarendon Press. ISBN 978-0-19-817328-1.
- Foskett, Daphne (1972). A dictionary of British miniature painters. Vol. 1. New York: Praeger Publishers. LCCN 72112634. (registration required)
- Hanks, Patrick, ed. (2016). The Oxford Dictionary of Family Names in Britain and Ireland. Vol. 4. Oxford University Press. ISBN 978-0-19-879884-2.
- Hemingway, Andrew (1988). The Norwich School of Painters, 1803-33. Oxford: Phaidon. ISBN 978-0-7148-2001-9. (registration required)
- Mackie, Charles (1901). Norfolk Annals. Lulu Com. ISBN 978-1-4710-8854-4.
- Moore, Andrew (1985). The Norwich School of Artists. London: HMSO. ISBN 978-0-11-701587-6.
- Rajnai, Miklos; Stevens, Mary (1976). The Norwich Society of Artists, 1805-1833: a dictionary of contributors and their work. Norwich: Norfolk Museums Service for the Paul Mellon Centre for Studies in British Art. ISBN 978-0-903101-29-5.
- Searle, Geoffrey Russell (2015). Etchings of the Norwich School. Norwich: Lasse Press. ISBN 978-0-9568758-9-1.
- Walpole, Josephine (1997). Art and Artists of the Norwich School. Woodbridge: Antique Collectors' Club. ISBN 978-1-85149-261-9.
- Williamson, George Charles (1904). The history of portrait miniatures. London: G. Bell. LCCN 05013592.
