= Thomas Mann Baynes =

English artist and lithographer

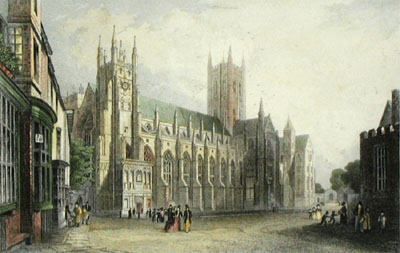
Canterbury Cathedral by Thomas Mann Baynes

Thomas Mann Baynes (1794–1876) was an English artist and lithographer. He is known for his drawings and watercolours of landscapes, buildings and outdoor events.

== Life ==
He was London born, and is probably the son of James Baynes, a noted watercolour artist. He produced views of Liverpool and Ireland, and appears to have made a successful living as a printer.

== Works ==
Phenakistiscope disc (animated) Running rats, Fantascope by T.M. Baynes, 1833

Thomas Mann Baynes' works include:

- Views on the River Thames in London
- View of the Canterbury and Whitstable Railway From Over the Tunnel, Taken on the Opening Day, May 3, 1830
- The Giant's Causeway
- Phenakistiscope discs

Many of his subjects were engraved and published, generally in London. A notable panorama of the River Thames was drawn from nature and engraved on stone.

== Family ==
Fredrick Thomas Baynes (1824–1874) also a watercolour artist, was probably his son.
