= Emma Sillett =

British painter

Emma Sillett (baptised 21 February 1802 – 27 January 1880) was a British painter, known for her flower paintings.

== Biography ==
Sillett grew up in Norwich and was one of the two surviving children, three siblings having died as infants, of Ann Banyard and the painter James Sillett. Emma Sillett was taught painting by her father and would eventually assist him with his art teaching and adopted a similar style of painting to his. She was a highly competent flower painter in her own right and between 1813 and 1833 exhibited some 48 paintings with the Norwich Society of Artists. Emma and her brother lived together in Norfolk where she died in 1880. Norwich Museum and Art Gallery hold examples of her paintings.
