= Clover (disambiguation) =

Clover is a genus of small, trifoliate plants.

Clover may also refer to:

== Places ==
United States

- Clover, Ohio, an unincorporated community
- Clover, South Carolina, a town in York County
  - Clover Downtown Historic District
- Clover, Virginia, a place in Halifax County
- Clover, West Virginia (disambiguation)
- Clover, Wisconsin, a town
- Clover, Manitowoc County, Wisconsin, an unincorporated community
- Clover Township (disambiguation)

Canada

- Clover Lawn, Alberta, a locality in Leduc County
- Clover Point, a park in Victoria, British Columbia
- Clover Bar Bridge, a structure in Edmonton, Alberta

== Bodies of water ==
United States

- Clover Creek (Pennsylvania), a tributary of the Frankstown Branch Juniata River
- Clover Creek (Washington), a stream in Washington State

Canada

- Clover Lake, island lake in British Columbia

== Arts and entertainment ==
=== Characters ===
- Clover (creature), from the Cloverfield film series
- Clover, a character from the novel Animal Farm
- Clover, a principal character in the Hillsover series of books by Susan Coolidge
- Clover, a common rabbit from the children's animated television series Sofia the First
- Clover, a main character from the Canadian-French animated television show Totally Spies!
- Clover, the player character in Undertale Yellow
- Clover, a miniboss and enemy in Deltarune.
- Clover, a recurring character in the Zero Escape video game series
- Clover, a character in Pokémon Legends: Arceus
- Clover, a character in What Katy Did

=== Film ===
- Clover (2014 film), a Japanese live-action drama based on Toriko Chiya's manga
- Clover (1997 film), an American television film based on Dori Sanders's novel
- Clover (2020 film), an American film by Jon Abrahams

=== Literature ===
- Clover, a 1990 novel by Dori Sanders
- Clover (Clamp manga), 1997–1999
- Clover (Tetsuhiro Hirakawa manga), 2007–2015
- Clover (Toriko Chiya manga), 1997–2010

=== Music ===
- Clover Records, a record label
- Clover (band), a 1967–1978 American country rock band
  - Clover (album) by Clover, 1970
- Clover (musical trio), a South Korean hip hop group
- The Clovers, an American R&B vocal group
- "Clover", a song by Chanyeol from Black Out, 2024
- "Clover", a song by Fromis 9 from To. Day, 2018
- "Clover", a song by Sifow from Clarity, 2006
- "Clover", a song by Xiu Xiu from La Forêt, 2005
- Clover-Lynn and The Hellfires, American bluegrass band
- "Clover", a song by IDK (rapper) featuring Joey Valence & Brae
- "Clover" (Maaya Sakamoto song), a song by Maaya Sakamoto, 2020

== Companies ==
- Clover (toy company), a Japanese toy company
- Clover Industries, a South African dairy company
- Clover Discount Store, a defunct discount department store
- Clover Equipment Company, a company that manufactures coffee equipment
- Clover Food Lab, a vegetarian fast food and food truck company based in Boston, MA
- Clover Network, a point of sale hardware technology company based in Sunnyvale, California and now owned by Fiserv
- Clover Sonoma, a dairy company based in Sonoma County, California
- Clover Studio, a defunct Japanese game development studio
  - Clovers, a Japanese game development studio founded by Hideki Kamiya and other former members of Clover Studio

== Products ==
- Clover (mobile app), a mobile dating app
- Clover (spread), a brand of dairy spread in the United Kingdom
- Clover (Pillow Pal), a Pillow Pal bunny made by Ty, Inc.
- Pigs in Clover, a ball-in-maze game invented in 1889

== Science and computing ==
- Clover (detector), a gamma ray detector
- Clover (telescope)
- Clover, the ⌘ command key on Apple computer keyboards
- Clover (software), a Java code coverage analysis tool from Atlassian, Inc.
- CLOVER2000, a family of modulation techniques
- Clover, a GUI bootloader

== People ==
- Clover (given name)
- Clover (surname)

== Other uses ==
- The Clover, a former alliance of political parties in Italy
- Clover lawn

== See also ==
- Cloverleaf
