= Joseph Clover (disambiguation) =

Joseph Clover may refer to:

- Joseph Thomas Clover (1825–1882), English doctor
- Joseph Clover (farrier) (1725–1811), English farrier
- Joseph Clover (artist) (1779–1853), English painter
