= Coffee production in Costa Rica =

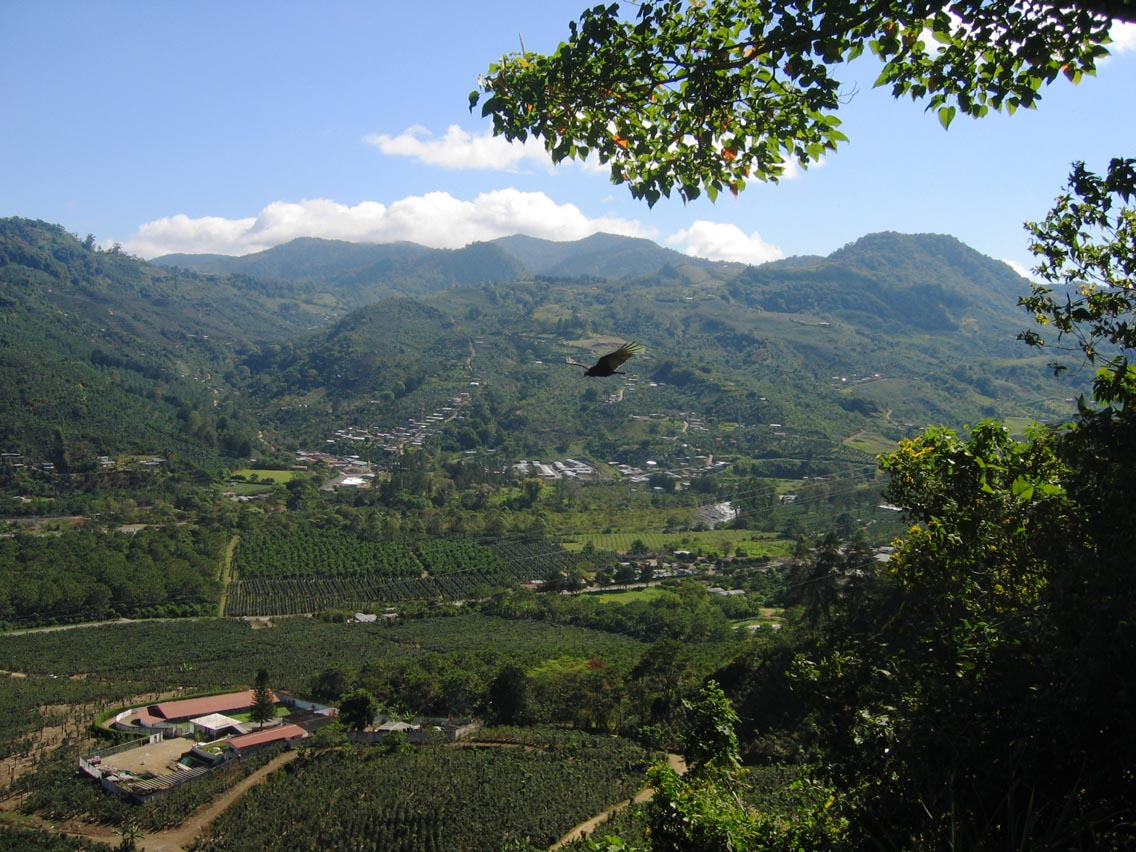
A coffee plantation in the Orosí valley

Coffee production has played a key role in Costa Rica's history and continues to be important to the country's economy. In 2006, coffee was Costa Rica's number three export, after being the number one cash crop export for several decades. The largest growing areas are in the provinces of San José, Alajuela, Heredia, Puntarenas, and Cartago. The coffee is exported to other countries in the world and is also exported to cities in Costa Rica.

As a small country, Costa Rica now provides under 1% of the world's coffee production. In 2015, the value of its coffee exports was US$305.9 million, a small part of the total agricultural exports of US$2.7 billion or of the total of all exports which was US$12.6 billion. In 1997, the agriculture sector employed 28 percent of the labor force and comprised 20 percent of Costa Rica's total GNP. Production increased from 158,000 tons in 1988 to 168,000 tons in 1992. Coffee production increased by 13.7% percent in 2015–2016, declined by 17.5% in 2016–2017 but was expected to increase by about 15% in the subsequent year.

== History ==
Coffee production in the country began in 1779 in the Meseta Central which had ideal soil and climate conditions for coffee plantations. Coffea arabica first imported to Europe through Arabia, whence it takes its name, was introduced to the country directly from Ethiopia. In the nineteenth century, the Costa Rican government strongly encouraged coffee production, and the industry fundamentally transformed a colonial regime and village economy built on direct extraction by a city-based elite towards organized production for export on a larger scale. The government offered farmers plots of land for anybody who wanted to harvest the plants. The coffee plantation system in the country therefore developed in the nineteenth century largely as a result of the government's open policy, although the problem with coffee barons did play a role in internal differentiation and inequality in growth. Soon coffee became a major source of revenue surpassing cacao, tobacco, and sugar production as early as 1829.

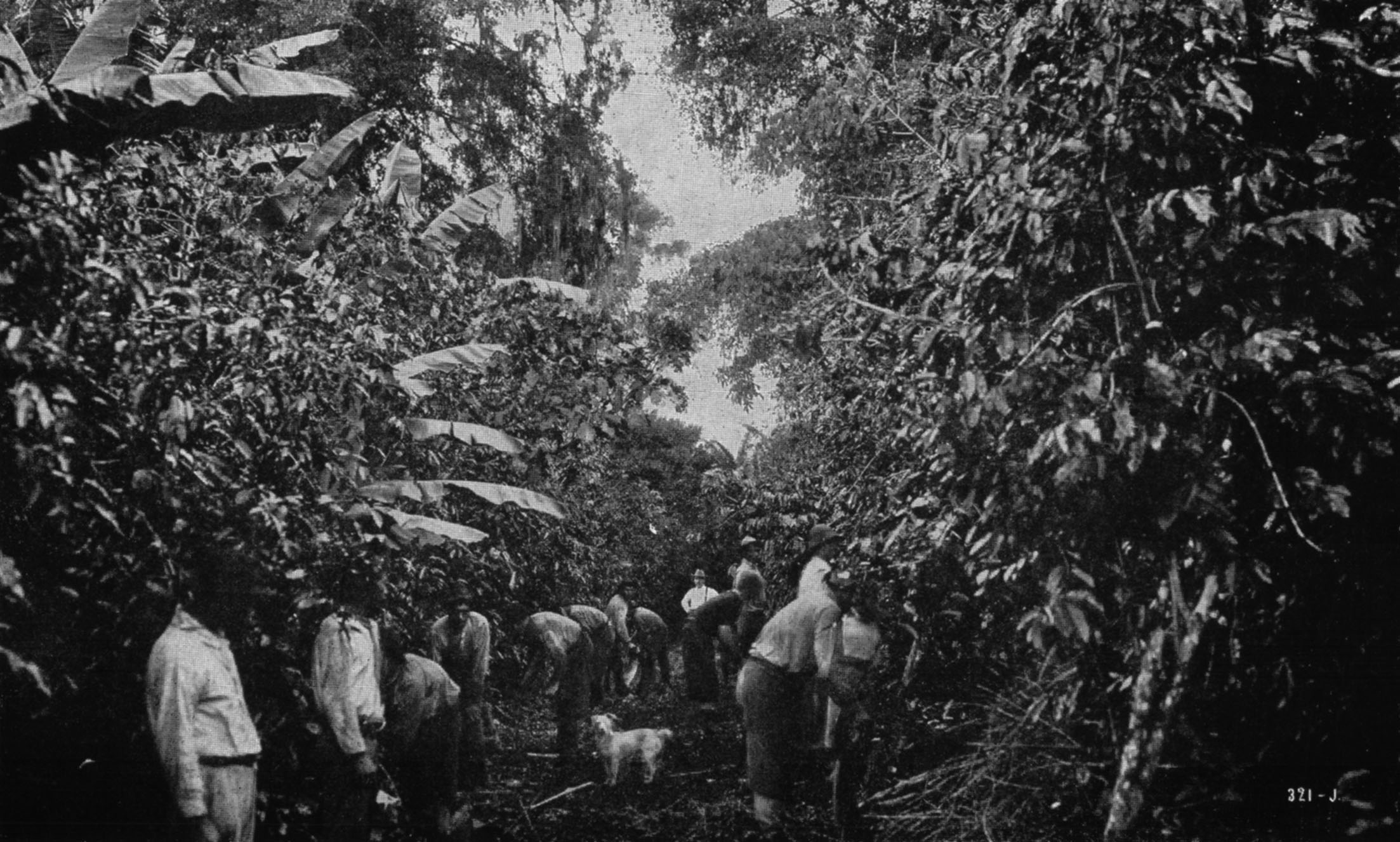
Early plantation workers in Costa Rica

Exports across the border to Panama were not interrupted when Costa Rica joined other Central American provinces in 1821 in a joint declaration of independence from Spain. In 1832, Costa Rica, at the time a state in the Federal Republic of Central America, began exporting coffee to Chile where it was re-bagged and shipped to England under the brand of “Café Chileno de Valparaíso”. In 1843, a shipment was sent directly to the United Kingdom by the Guernseyman William Le Lacheur, captain of the English ship, The Monarch, who had seen the potential of directly cooperating with the Costa Ricans. He sent several hundred-pound bags and following this the British developed an interest in the country. They invested heavily in the Costa Rican coffee industry, becoming the principal customer for exports until World War II. This led to the establishment of the Anglo-Costa Rican Bank in 1863, which provided finance to allow the industry to grow. Growers and traders of the coffee industry transformed the Costa Rican economy, and contributed to modernization in the country, which provided funding for young aspiring academics to study in Europe. The revenue generated by the coffee industry in Costa Rica funded the first railroads linking the country to the Atlantic Coast in 1890, the “Ferrocarril al Atlántico”. The National Theater itself in San José is a product of the first coffee farmers in the country.

Coffee was vital to the Costa Rican economy by the early to mid-20th Century. Leading coffee growers were prominent members of society. Due to the centrality of coffee in the economy, price fluctuations from changes to conditions in larger coffee producers, like Brazil, had major reverberations in Costa Rica. When the price of coffee on the global market dropped, it could greatly impact the Costa Rican economy.

In 1955 an export tax was placed on Costa Rican coffee. The current export tax is levied at 1.5%. In 1983, a major blight struck the coffee industry in the country, throwing the industry into a crisis that coincided with falling market prices; world coffee prices plummeted around 40% after the collapse of the world quota cartel system. By the late 1980s and early 1990s, coffee production had increased, from 158,000 tons in 1988 to 168,000 in 1992, but prices had fallen, from $316 million in 1988 to $266 million in 1992. In 1989, Costa Rica joined Honduras, Guatemala, Nicaragua, and El Salvador to establish a Central American coffee retention plan which agreed that the product was to be sold in installments to ensure market stability. There was an attempt by the International Coffee Organization in the 1990s to maintain export quotas that would support coffee prices worldwide.

At present, the production of coffee in the Great Metropolitan Area around the capital of San José has decreased in recent years due to the effects of urban sprawl. As the cities have expanded into the countryside, poor plantation owners have often been forced to sell up to building corporations.

== Production ==
Coffee growing regions of Costa Rica Valle Occidental Tarrazú Tres Ríos Orosi Turrialba Valle Central Guanacaste Brunca

Coffee production in the country relies on cheap, seasonal labor: Nicaraguan immigrants are often employed on these plantations. Coffee cultivators in the country are paid very little, often as little as US$1.5 per basket picked, but the wages are not less than in many other industries of the Costa Rican primary sectors. The berries are picked by the workers and are transported to processing plants to be washed and to remove the pulp around the beans. In Costa Rica the processing plants where this process is done are called beneficios but the effects of pulp removal may result in non-beneficial environmental effects (see below). The beans are then laid out to dry in the sun, then sorted according to size and shape. Although mechanical drying is gradually replacing manual labor in places, time-consuming sun drying, and equipment are required to dry the wet seeds after pulping. Once processing is complete, the coffee is bagged into burlap sacks (with or without a moisture barrier bag) and stored until exported.

=== Eight growing regions and seasons ===
The eight recognized growing regions and season are illustrated in the table below. The finest coffee is typically grown at altitudes of 1,200 to 1,700 meters, in a shorter winter growing season; the lower quality coffee is typically grown at altitudes below 1,200 metres, in a longer growing season that lasts from late summer through to winter.

		Altitude													Harvest										Blend Nature		
Region	Subregion	600	700	800	900	1,000	1,200	1,300	1,350	1,400	1,600	1,650	1,700	1,900	Jun	Jul	Ago	Sep	Oct	Nov	Dec	Jan	Feb	Mar	Acidity	Body	Aroma
Valle Occidental																									Very good	Very good	Very good
Tarrazú																									High, fine, not pungent	Good	Excellent
Tres Ríos																									Very high, fine	Very good	Very good
Orosi																									Medium to light	Good	Good
Turrialba																									Normal	Little	Good
Valle Central																									High, very fine	Very good	Very good
Guanacaste	San Carlos, Sarapiquí																								Balanced	Balanced	Balanced
Guanacaste	Nicoya Peninsula																								Balanced	Balanced	Balanced
Guanacaste	Puntarenas																								Balanced	Balanced	Balanced
Brunca	Coto Brus																								Normal	Normal	Normal
Brunca	Pérez Zeledón																								Excellent	Excellent	Excellent

== Reputation ==
Costa Rican coffee beans are considered among the best in the world. Tarrazú is thought to produce the most desirable coffee beans in Costa Rica. Following the great success of Panama Geisha coffee, Geisha Coffee production started in 2012 in the area of Tarrazú. Tarrazú Geisha coffee became the most expensive coffee sold by Starbucks in 48 of their stores in the United States, using the Clover automated French press.

The Agriculture and Livestock Ministry and the Costa Rican Coffee Institute organize an annual festival: National Coffee Day, during which a producer is awarded the Cup of Excellence for the highest quality of coffee produced in Costa Rica. The winner sells their coffee through an auction to the international community.

== Awards and recognition ==
In the past decade, Costa Rican coffee has garnered numerous prestigious awards, reflecting its exceptional quality and global recognition. Notable achievements include:

- Cup of Excellence: This international program awards the best specialty coffees worldwide. In 2023, the Los Santos region secured the top three positions, with producer Johel Monge achieving first place with a score of 91.08.
- World Coffee Challenge 2022: Costa Rica excelled in this international competition, winning six first prizes across various categories, including Arabica Natural, Arabica Honey, and Sustainable Coffee.
- Sintercafé Award: At the XVIII edition of Sintercafé, the best coffees from Costa Rica were honored. Winners included Barrantes Estate SHB from Cafetalera Herbazú and Don Quijote from Deli Café

== Environmental impact ==
Although coffee production in Costa Rica is a major source of revenue, it is not without its environmental problems. The main effect on the environment is the pollution of rivers during the separation and de-pulping process at the beneficio processing plants or mills. After the beans are separated from the pulp, the beans are left to ferment in a water tank to remove the gummy gel that surrounds the bean. By the end of the drying process, there is leftover pulp and sugar water. In the past, many coffee producers dumped the pulp waste directly into the rivers. Coffee processing has long been one of the most significant sources of agro-industrial wastewater in Costa Rica and has raised public health concerns; the Ministry of Health was eventually ordered to protect water quality from coffee-processing discharges, and efforts to reduce this contamination have been reinforced by certification programmes that pay producers higher prices. The pulp as it decays in river water has the effect of depleting the water of oxygen and killing off aquatic life.

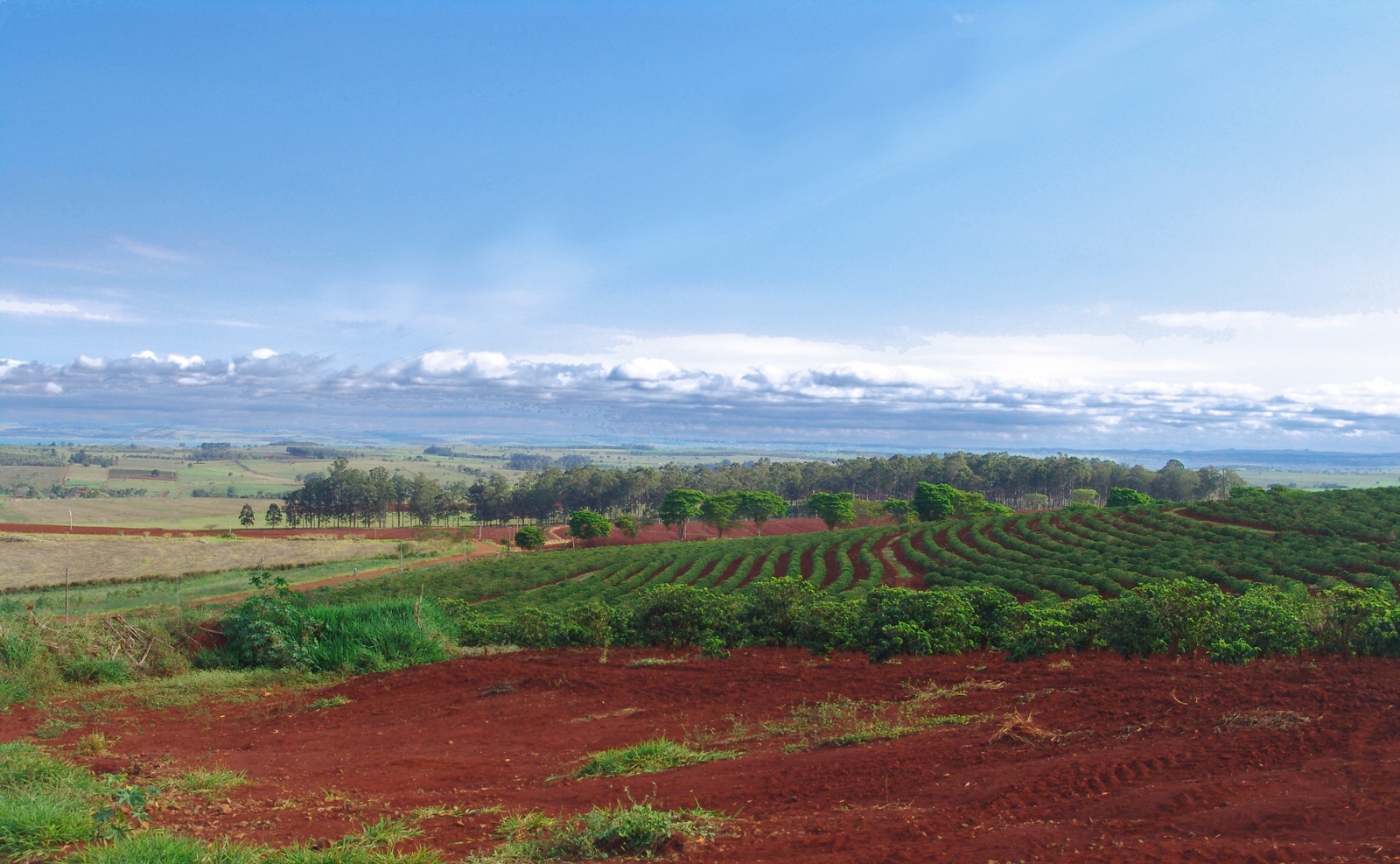
Coffee production may increase the risk of soil erosion

By the early 1990s, the problem had raised serious concerns, and in January 1995 the government passed new legislation which imposed regulations on the proper treatment of solid and liquid waste. Some farmers in the country have attempted to use the pulp waste in soils as a fertilizer, but deforestation for coffee production may result in soil erosion and additional environmental costs. Deforestation is not new in Costa Rica. Major deforestation began in the 1830s with the introduction of coffee cultivation in the Meseta Central region, which was the cradle of the nation's coffee industry. By 1900 however, deforestation had accelerated rapidly in other parts of the country. Coffee was ideally suited to the soil and bio-climatic conditions of the volcanic mountain ranges of the central meseta, but by this time cultivation had begun extensively in the more vulnerable hill forests to provide coffee that was in increasing demand for export. By the 1970s and 1980s, this along with the removal of forest for pasture land and ranching had resulted in an annual forestry loss of 4% per annum, one of the highest rates in Latin America at the time.

== See also ==
- Juan Valdez drinks Costa Rican coffee
- List of countries by coffee production
