= Clüver =

Clüver is a surname. Notable people with the surname include:

- Bernd Clüver (1948–2011), German singer
- Philipp Clüver (1580–1622), German historian

== See also ==
- Clover (surname)
