= Clovechok =

Clovechok is a surname. Notable people with the surname include:

- Andy Clovechok (1923–2016), Canadian professional hockey player
- Doug Clovechok, Canadian politician

== See also ==
- Clover (disambiguation)
