= Clover Park =

Clover Park may refer to:

- Clover Park, New Zealand, suburb of Auckland
- Clover Park (Florida), baseball stadium in Port St Lucie
- Clover Park School District, school district in Washington State
- Clover Point, a park in Victoria, British Columbia
- Clover Park (Chicago), Chicago, Il city park.
