= Clover (surname) =

Clover is a surname. Notable people with the surname include:

- Carol J. Clover, American professor
- Elzada Clover (1896–1980), American botanist
- Hannah Clover (born 2002), Canadian Wikipedia editor
- Joseph Clover (1779–1853), British portrait painter
- Joseph Clover (farrier) (1725–1811), English farrier
- Joseph Thomas Clover (1825–1882), pioneer anaesthetist, nephew of Joseph Clover
- Joshua Clover (1962–2025), American writer, poet, and university professor

== See also ==
- Clover (given name), the given name
- Jen Cloher (born 1973), Australian singer, songwriter, and record producer
