= Clover Food Lab =

American vegetarian fast casual chain

- Industry: Food
- Founded: October 2008
- Defunct: May 2026
- Headquarters: Cambridge, Massachusetts
- Number of locations: 11 restaurants, (as of March 2026)
- Area served: Boston, Sudbury, Cambridge, Burlington, Westford, Somerville
- Key people: Ayr Muir (Founder); Julia Wrin Piper (Chief Executive Officer)
- Products: Fast food
- Number of employees: 182 (March 2026)
- Website: cloverfoodlab.com

Clover Food Lab is a vegetarian fast food chain founded in 2008 which operates food trucks and restaurants in Massachusetts, United States. The company serves a simple menu that changes daily and with the seasons based on what is available from local farmers and includes a large mix of organic ingredients. The company also offered meal delivery boxes and catering.

== History ==
The company was founded in October 2008, by the MIT material science graduate and Harvard MBA Ayr Muir, as one food truck serving the area around the Massachusetts Institute of Technology (MIT). As of summer 2018, Clover Food Lab had some 400 employees operating in 12 restaurants across the greater Boston area.

The COVID-19 pandemic and the 2023 United States banking crisis disrupted Clover's expansion plans, and caused its Back Bay location to close in August 2023. On November 3, 2023, high rents and continued low sales prompted Clover Food Lab to declare Chapter 11 bankruptcy. The company emerged from bankruptcy on April 24, 2024.

On March 30, 2026 the company announced it was seeking a buyer, and without one would close on May 29, 2026.

On May 26, 2026, the company announced it would be winding down operations and closing its remaining restaurants by May 28, 2026.. A week later, on June 3, the company announced in an email to customers that it would reopen its Boston and Cambridge locations on June 9. They cited an anonymous investor that intervened following the May 26 closure announcement.

== Environmental vision ==
The company was founded by Ayr Muir, a graduate of MIT in Material Science and Harvard Business School MBA program. Muir, a distant cousin of naturalist John Muir, has cited environmental motivations as a driving force behind the company's creation. He wishes "to shrink the ecological footprint of the food industry by making fresh, local, sustainable vegetarian food as common and convenient as the fare at Burger King or McDonald's". The company's food trucks are decommissioned and retrofitted cargo vehicles that use recycled vegetable oil to help them run. All of the company's utensils, napkins, and other items are compostable. Despite Clover Food Lab's focus on local, sustainable and vegetarian food, Muir consciously avoids branding the company's food as such, fearing that "no one will eat it if we do".

== Design ==
Clover Food Lab's trucks and restaurants had minimalist, somewhat industrial design, and included elements that gave them the look and feel of a laboratory. The sides and walls were plain white, with menus displayed on TV screens which updated according to availability (previously written on whiteboards with black dry-erase marker to mimic the food truck) and the restaurants were brightly lit and had mostly stool seating. The kitchen had "a pop-up quality, as if the crew is here temporarily, planning to relocate elsewhere." Staff entered customer orders and process credit and debit cards through an iPad (previously an iPod touch), and give change from their money belts instead of cash registers. The restaurant style was often compared to that of an Apple Store. Orders were also taken on a dedicated in-house web app.

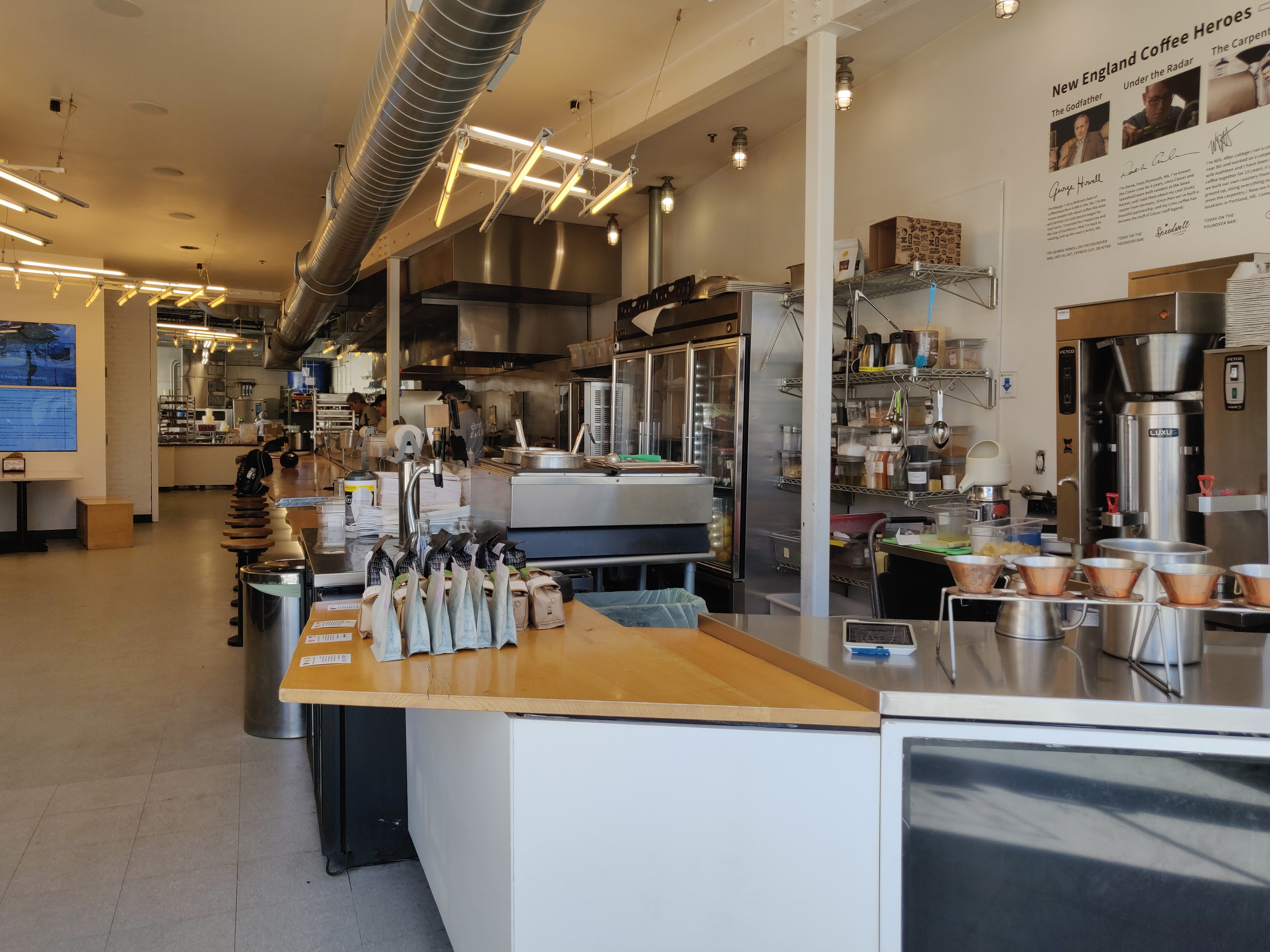
Interior of Inman Square location

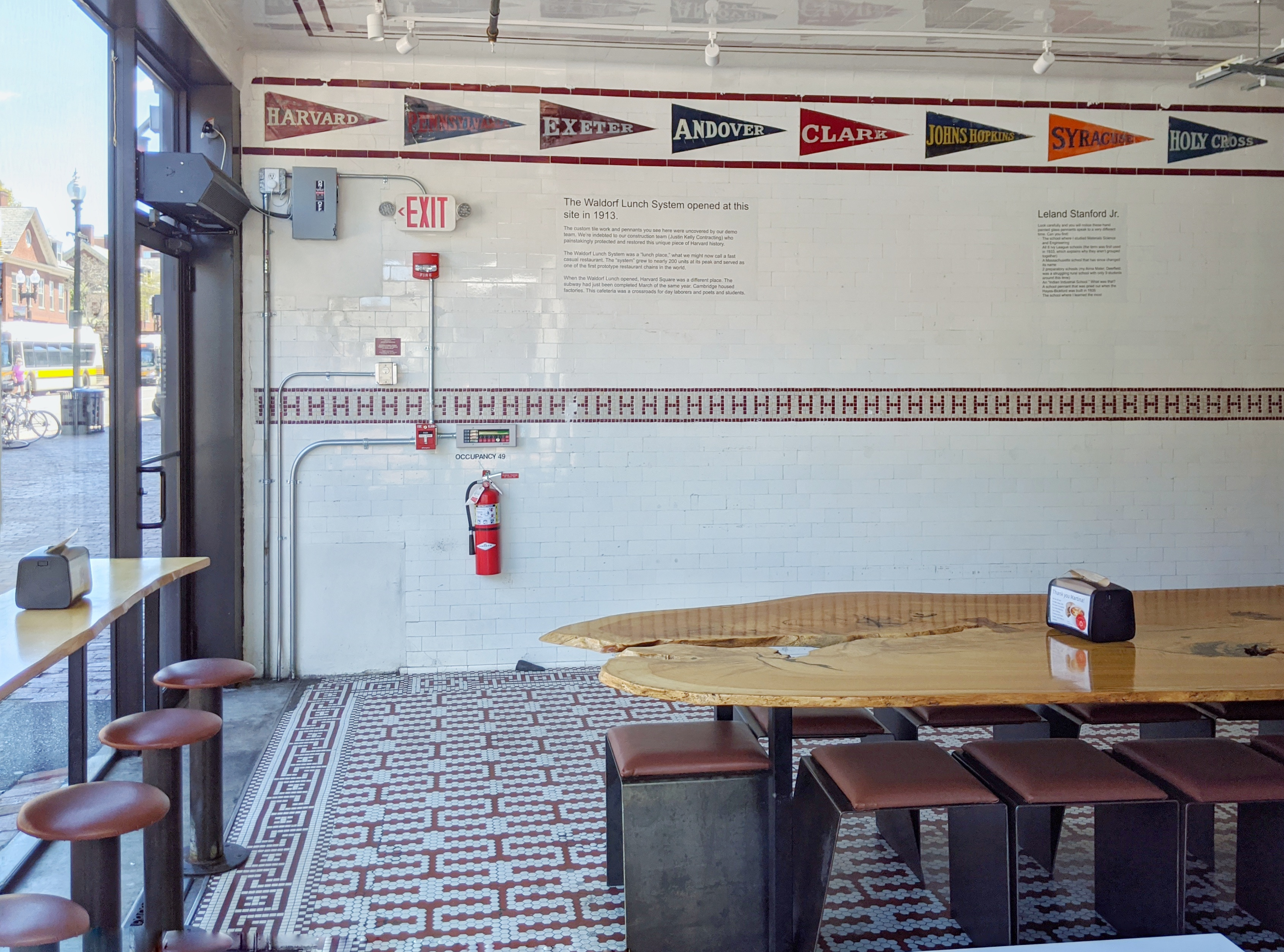
Harvard Square Massachusetts Avenue location seating

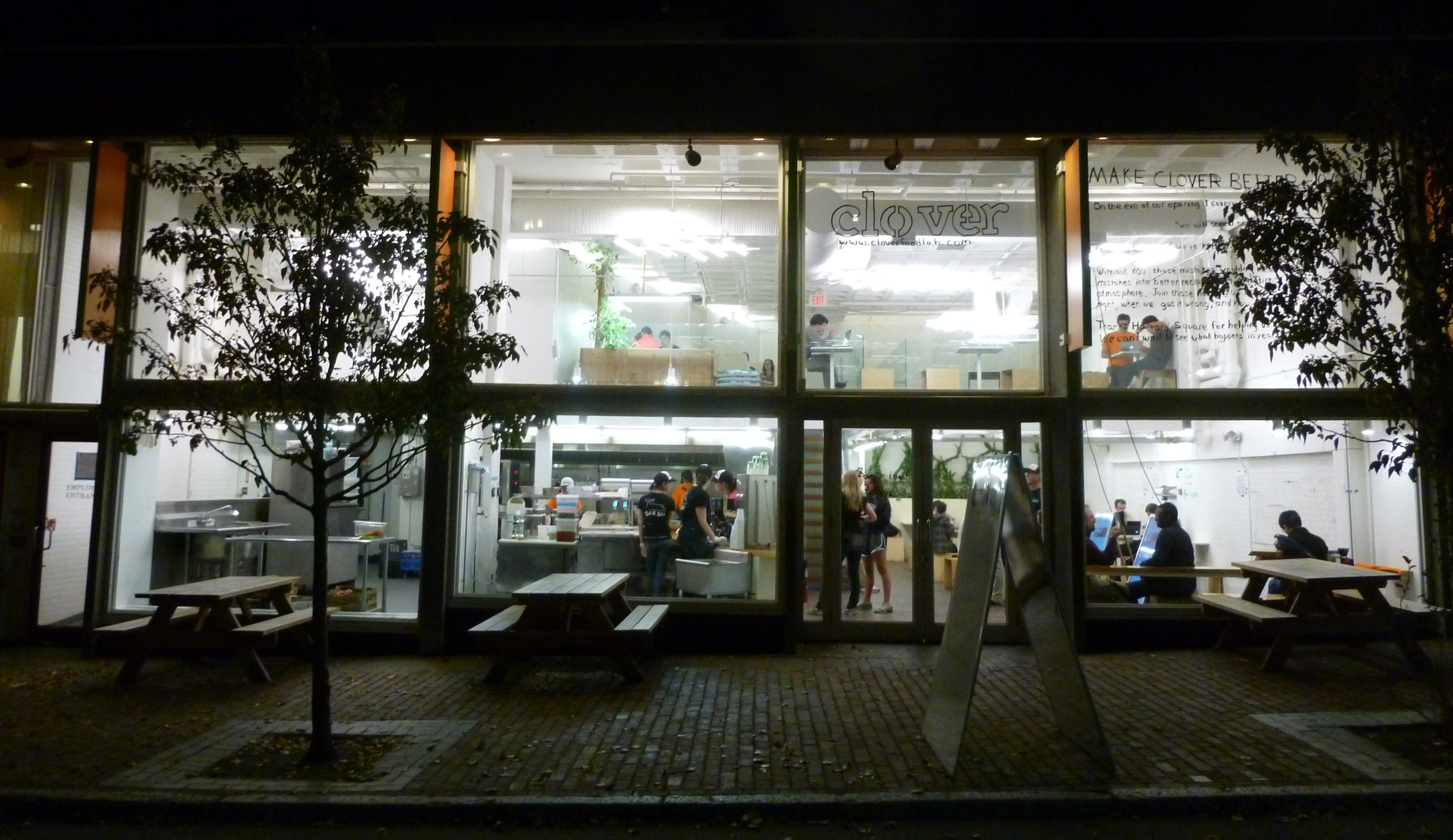
First location in Harvard Square

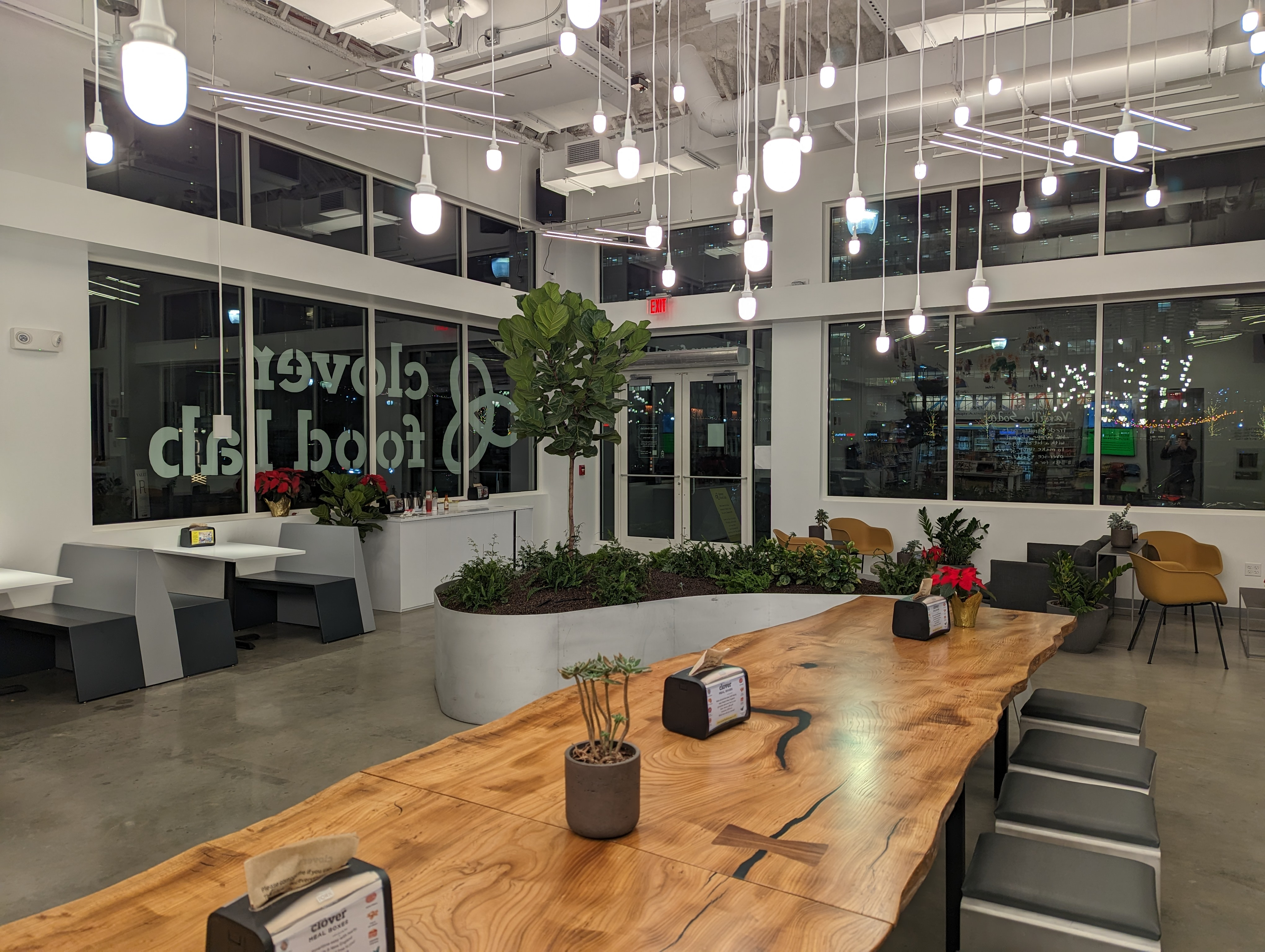
Assembly Square location

== Reception ==
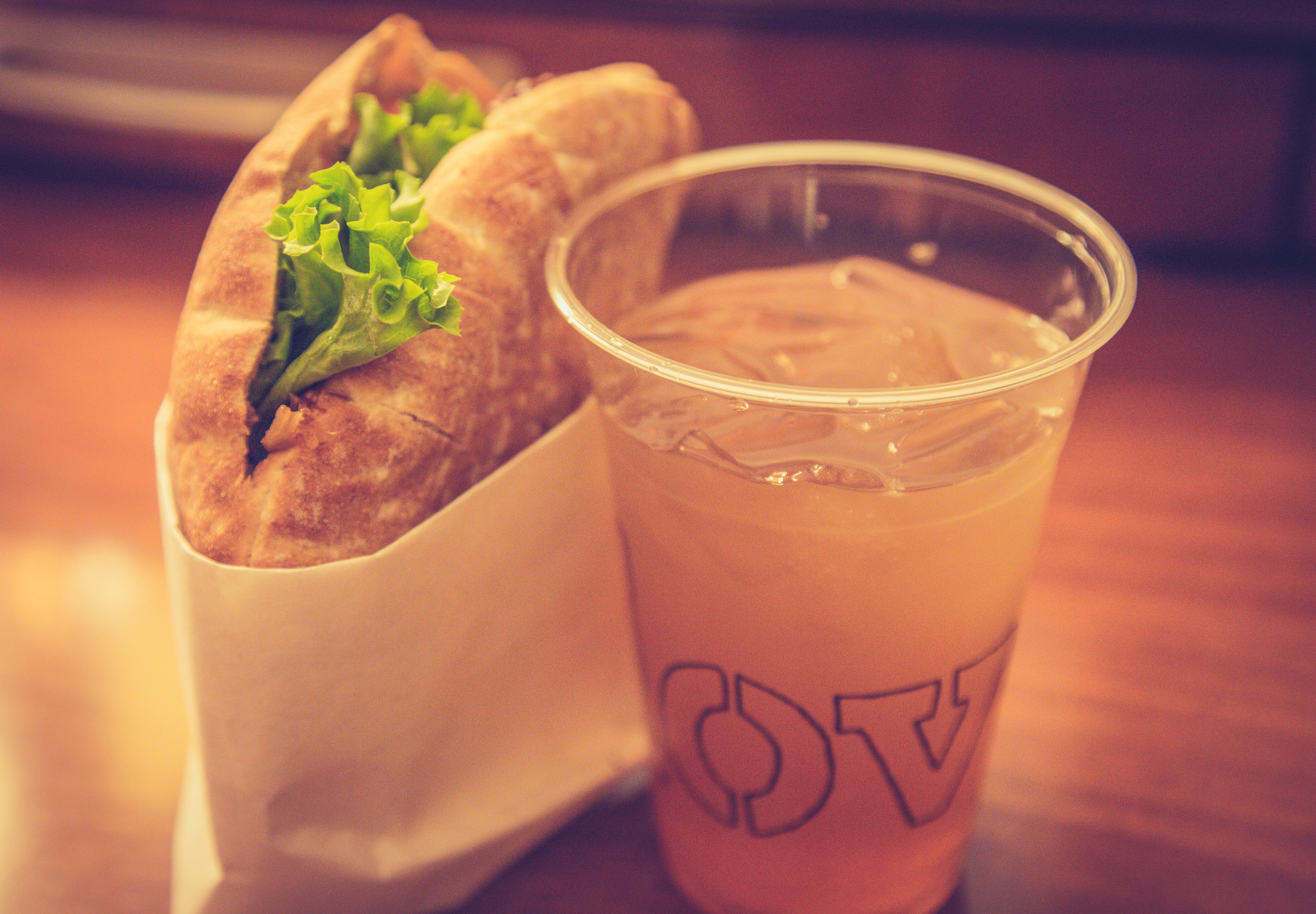
A Clover sandwich and drink

Clover Food Lab's BLT sandwich uses soy bacon, and was called the best BLT sandwich in Boston by Mayor Thomas Menino. The company was a winner of the Food Truck Challenge, a competition initiated by Menino to bring healthy mobile food vending to Boston, which has led to a rising trend in the city in the use of food and coffee trucks. Clover Food Lab was named one of the top 10 food trucks in the United States by The Wall Street Journal, and given the 2011 Best of Boston award for vegetarian food by The Improper Bostonian. The company was one of several food truck services highlighted by The Huffington Post for its intense use of technology (especially social media), distinctive product, and cult-like following. In 2016, it was named the best farm-to-table restaurant in Massachusetts by Travel + Leisure.

== Pay What You Want Day ==
Typically held on the first day of operations of a new Clover location, Pay What You Want Day allows the area to get to know the food and for the staff to work out their pace. In 2015, Pay What You Want Day was experienced in Central Square with the opening of CloverHFI.

In 2016, Clover Food Lab opened the doors to three new locations and one food truck all featuring Pay What You Want Day. All proceeds made during the openings were donated to The Food Project.

== Kosher certification ==
Most Clover locations are certified kosher by Lighthouse Kosher.
