= Clover (telescope) =

Canceled polarization experiment

- Location(s): Chile
- Wavelength: 95, 150, 225 GHz (3.16, 2.00, 1.33 mm)
- Website: www-astro.physics.ox.ac.uk/research/expcosmology/groupclover.html

Clover would have been an experiment to measure the polarization of the Cosmic Microwave Background. It was approved for funding in late 2004, with the aim of having the full telescope operational by 2009. The project was jointly run by Cardiff University, Oxford University, the Cavendish Astrophysics Group and the University of Manchester.

== History ==
The Clover Project was meant to consist of two independent telescopes, one operating at 95 GHz with the other operating at both 150 and 225 GHz. Both telescopes were to be sited near the CBI site in the Atacama Desert, Chile. The two telescope receivers would have been large format focal plane arrays of either 100 or 200 bolometric detectors.

The aim of the experiment was to measure the B-mode polarization of the Cosmic Microwave Background between multipoles of 20 and 1000 down to a sensitivity limited by the foreground contamination due to lensing. This would have allowed the detection of primordial gravitational waves in the universe so long as the ratio of scalar perturbations (caused by density fluctuations in the early universe) to the tensor perturbations caused by gravitational waves was greater than $r = 0.01$.

It was hoped that the telescope would have spent around 2 years observing a total of around 1,000 degrees of sky, made up of several patches of sky where polarized foregrounds (synchrotron and thermal dust emission) are at a minimum.

Clover was canceled in March 2009 as STFC were unable to provide the requested additional funds of 2.55 million pounds to finish the project.
