= Clover (given name) =

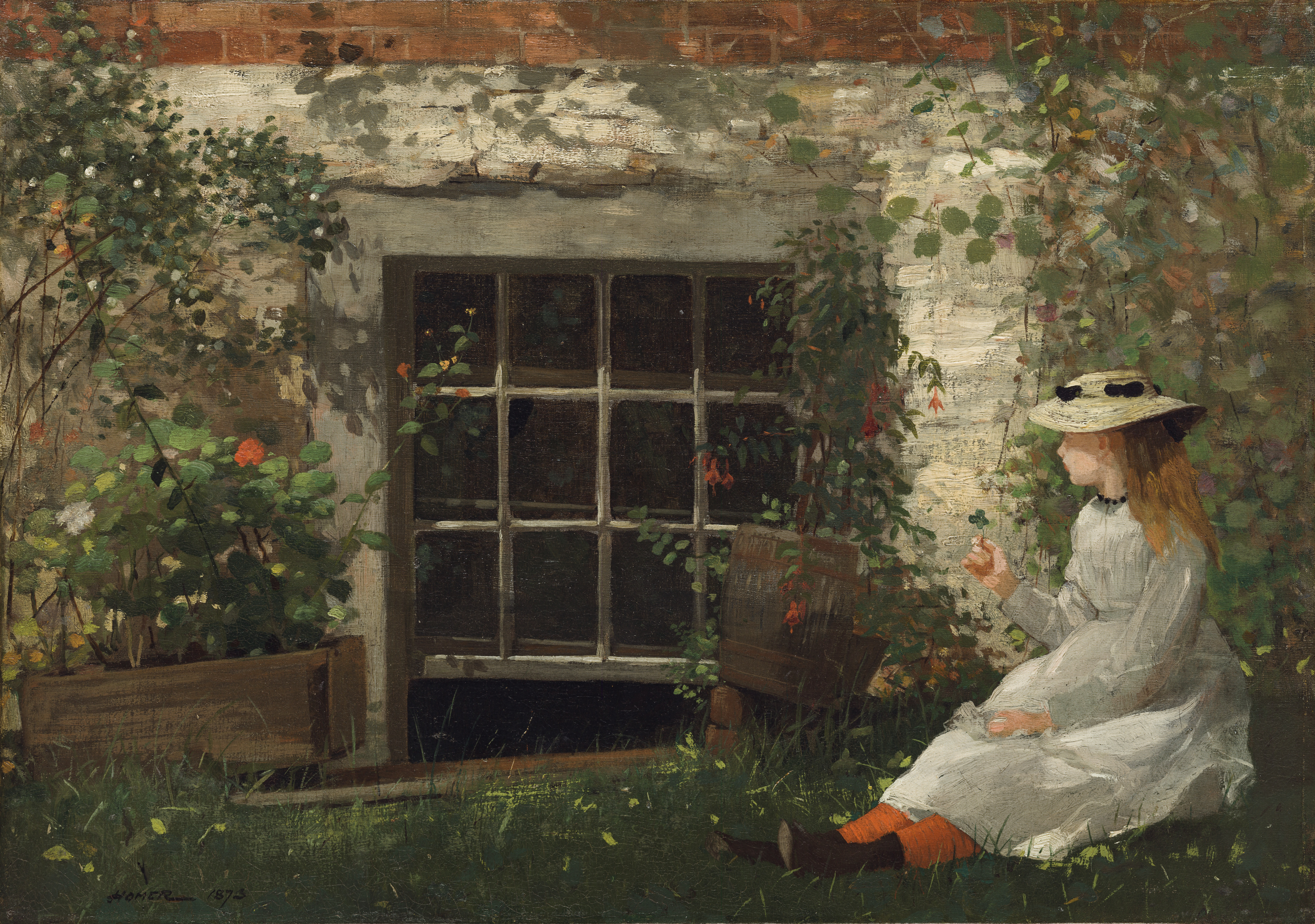
- The Four Leaf Clover by Winslow Homer, 1873.
- Gender: Feminine
- Language: English

Origin
- Meaning: Clover

Clover is a modern given name derived from the common name for the plant, which was ultimately derived from the Old English word clāfre. The name has associations with Ireland and with good fortune due to traditional tales about the Irish shamrock or four-leaf clover. The name has recently increased in usage, a trend that has been attributed to a renewed interest in “cottagecore names” with a vintage sensibility that are rooted in the natural world. The name has ranked among the 1,000 most used names for newborn girls in the United States since 2021. It also has ranked among the 1,000 most popular names for newborn girls in Canada since 2021. The name also ranked among the top 1,000 names for newborn girls in England and Wales in 2021, the year it ranked in 918th place on the popularity chart there.

== People ==
- Clover-Lynn, American bluegrass musician
- Clover Maitland (born 1972), Australian Olympian in women's field hockey
- Clover Moore (born 1945), Australian politician
- Clover Murray (born 1997), British cyclist

== See also ==
- Clover (surname)
