= Clover (mobile app) =

Online dating application

- Original author: Isaac Raichyk (founder)
- Developer: Clover Inc.
- Release: March 17, 2014; 12 years ago
- Stable release: 5.81 (iOS) & 2.7.1 (Android)
- Operating system: IOS 7 or later, Android 4.1 or later
- Available in: English
- Type: Social networking

Clover was a mobile dating app which connected with a user's Facebook account, or their email address. It was available for download for iOS as well as Android devices. Users could choose to turn their GPS location on or off and browse other users' profiles anonymously. Users could interact with each other by liking each other, sending text and multimedia chat messages, sending gifts, requesting dates using the "On Demand Dating" feature, or setup chat groups or group events using the "Mixers" feature. Users could also dislike other users which will remove them from future search results. Finally, users can exclude other users from contacting them based on their age, gender, or location in their privacy settings.

== History ==
Clover launched on the Apple iTunes store on March 17, 2014. and on the Google Play store on June 7, 2016. In 2023, the app was discontinued.

== Features ==
The Clover app was free to download, with most features also free to use. There were added features offered through a "Premium Clover Subscription", which could be purchased through an iTunes or Google Play account for 1, 3, or 6 months. A 7-day free trial could also be purchased, which would give users seven days to try the app for free before subscribing to a monthly subscription.

The app had several free features, including seeing who liked you, who you liked, who was a match, profile viewing information and photos. If a user liked you, you could chat with each other for free.

"Boosts" were required to feature yourself in the featured banner at the top of the chat screen and could be bought in packages of 1, 5, or 10.

Features, which required a "Premium Clover Subscription", included advanced filters for various parameters including: interests, intention, height, ethnicity, hair color and eye color. The subscription also allowed a user to send chat messages to anyone, regardless of whether that specific profile liked the user, and read receipts. Subscribers also received free "Boosts" so that they could feature themselves in the feature strip at the top of the chat screen.

Clover launched an "On Demand Dating" feature on January 7, 2015, that would let users have the app set up a date for them. Similar to a blind date, users could choose the location and time that they wished to have the date and the app listed potential matches. Users could then review their matches and confirm the date. The app also provided suggestions for locations based on price and popularity. This feature was free to use.

On February 22, 2016, Clover launched a free "Mixers" feature, which allowed users to create online chat groups and in-person meet up groups for users who share similar interests. Mixers could also be sorted by trending, number of attendees, number of comments, or most recently created profiles.

== User statistics ==
In its first four months, Clover acquired over 50,000 users with 52% coming from the United States and 16% coming from Canada. Roughly 30% of matches have been made after a user has previously passed on the other user.

By November 2014, the demographics were 69% male and 31% female, with 91% of users aged between 18 and 34 years old.

In March 2015, Clover surveyed 200,000 of its users, between the ages of 18 and 65, who had used their "On Demand Dating" section to find the top 30 locations people were choosing for their first dates. Starbucks was found to be the top location that users preferred. The survey also found that 52% of women preferred to meet at a coffee shop and 51% of men preferred to meet at a restaurant.
