= Cloverleaf =

Cloverleaf or clover leaf may refer to:

== Plant ==
- The leaf of the clover plant, or its shape

== Companies ==
- Clover Leaf Seafoods, Markham, Ontario-based marketer of seafood products

== Places ==
- Cloverleaf, Louisville, Kentucky, a neighborhood
- Cloverleaf, Texas, a suburb of Houston
- Cloverleaf Local School District in southern Medina County, Ohio

== Science and technology ==
- A representation of the chemical structure of a transfer RNA molecule
- The IEC 60320 C5, and C6 electrical power connectors, sometimes colloquially called cloverleaf connections
- Cloverleaf quasar, a rare example of a quadruply-lensed quasar
- Command key in apple computer, '⌘', colloquially known as the "cloverleaf" key
- The 4-round capacity model of the Colt House Revolver, a 19th-century handgun.
- Cloverleaf antenna, a type of antenna designed by Phillip Hagar Smith

== Transport ==
- A symbol for Alfa Romeo (vehicles)- see Alfa Romeo#The Quadrifoglio logo
- Cloverleaf interchange, a type of highway interchange
- Toledo, St. Louis and Western Railroad, commonly called the Clover Leaf

== Other uses ==
- 71st Infantry Division (Wehrmacht), nicknamed the Cloverleaf Division
- Clover Leaf (Fabergé egg)
- Cloverleaf, a submission hold in pro wrestling

== See also ==
- Four-leaf clover, a mutation
