= Clover Records =

1920s American record label

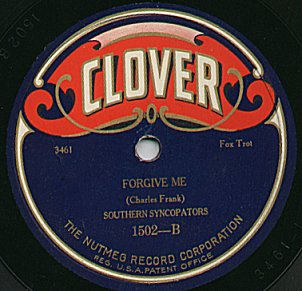
- Founded: 1920

Clover Records was a United States–based record label of the 1920s. According to their labels, Clover Records were manufactured by "The Nutmeg Record Corporation", which was part of the Emerson-Consolidated corporate group. Much of Clover's output were pressed from masters originally recorded by Emerson Records and Grey Gull Records. The output consisted primarily of dance music and popular vocals.

== See also ==
- List of record labels
