= Clover Point =

Park in Victoria, British Columbia

Coordinates: 48°24′18″N 123°21′00″W

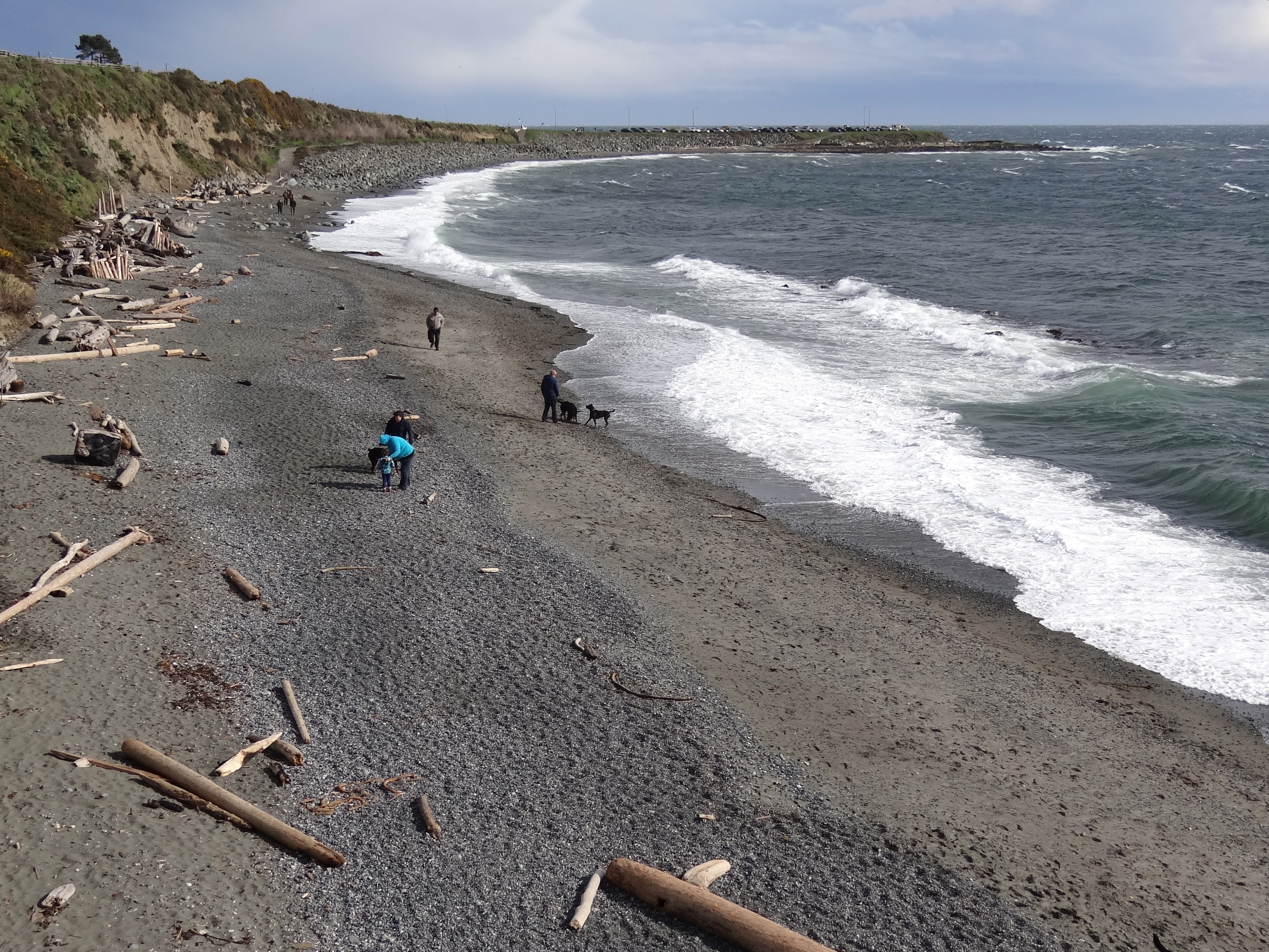
A pedestrian view of Clover Point

Clover Point is a waterfront adjacent park in Victoria, British Columbia. The park contains 4 ha (10 acres) of land and faces the Strait of Juan de Fuca. It was originally named by James Douglas in 1842 through a letter to John McLoughlin. The park was closed to the public from 1900 to 1930, as well as for the duration of World War 2 for use by the Canadian military. The park's ownership was transferred from the military to the city of Victoria in 1988. A redesign of the park was proposed in 2021 and then implemented.

== Early history ==
James Douglas named Clover Point after the red clover present in the landscape. The specific species of clover present was likely Trifolium wormskioldii; the plant's rhizomes were an important food source for Indigenous peoples of the Pacific Northwest Coast. Clover was often prepared with Pacific silverweed, dried out, and pit cooked. Exact practices for traditional preparation varied between particular Indigenous peoples. It is disputed whether Douglas named the area when he disembarked from the Beaver or Cadboro. Douglas wrote a letter to John McLoughlin describing Clover Point in 1842. Clover Point is referenced as a boundary marker in treaty negotiations between the Swengwhung people and the Hudson's Bay Company, with land east of the area being included as part of the treaty. Douglas purchased land through a series of fourteen treaties while acting as an agent for the company. His intentions surrounding permanent ownership of the land may not have been fully understood. He asked those who signed to mark the paper with an X before receiving goods, which may have been misconstrued as a spiritual gesture. He also did not take into account that various Indigenous peoples had overlapping shared use of certain areas. Land within the James Bay Peninsula was purchased for 75 pounds sterling, which was a small portion of his total wealth.

== Later history ==
Clover Point car loop before redesign

Redesigned version of the loop

The clover that was originally present in Clover Point was eradicated and replaced with non-native grass. From 1900 to 1930, public access to Clover Point was prohibited. The military used it as the Clover Point Rifle Range. Access to Clover Point was restricted again during World War II. Trench warfare practice was conducted elsewhere near the waterfront. In 1988, the Department of Defence transferred ownership of the property to the city.

Since the 1970s, an underground sewage pumping centre has existed at Clover Point. In 2016, heavy rainfall caused the station's equipment to fail and release accidental discharge. That same year, Clover Point was rejected as a location for an additional plant. Before 2020, the station only screened sewage before dumping the untreated wastewater directly into the Strait of Juan de Fuca. Mr. Floatie, a 2.1 metres (7 ft) environmental awareness mascot depicting fecal matter, was retired once sewage treatment was implemented. A regional wastewater treatment plant opened at McLoughlin Point in December 2020 as part of a federal mandate; the dispersal of untreated sewage had soured relations between British Columbia and neighboring Washington in the United States.

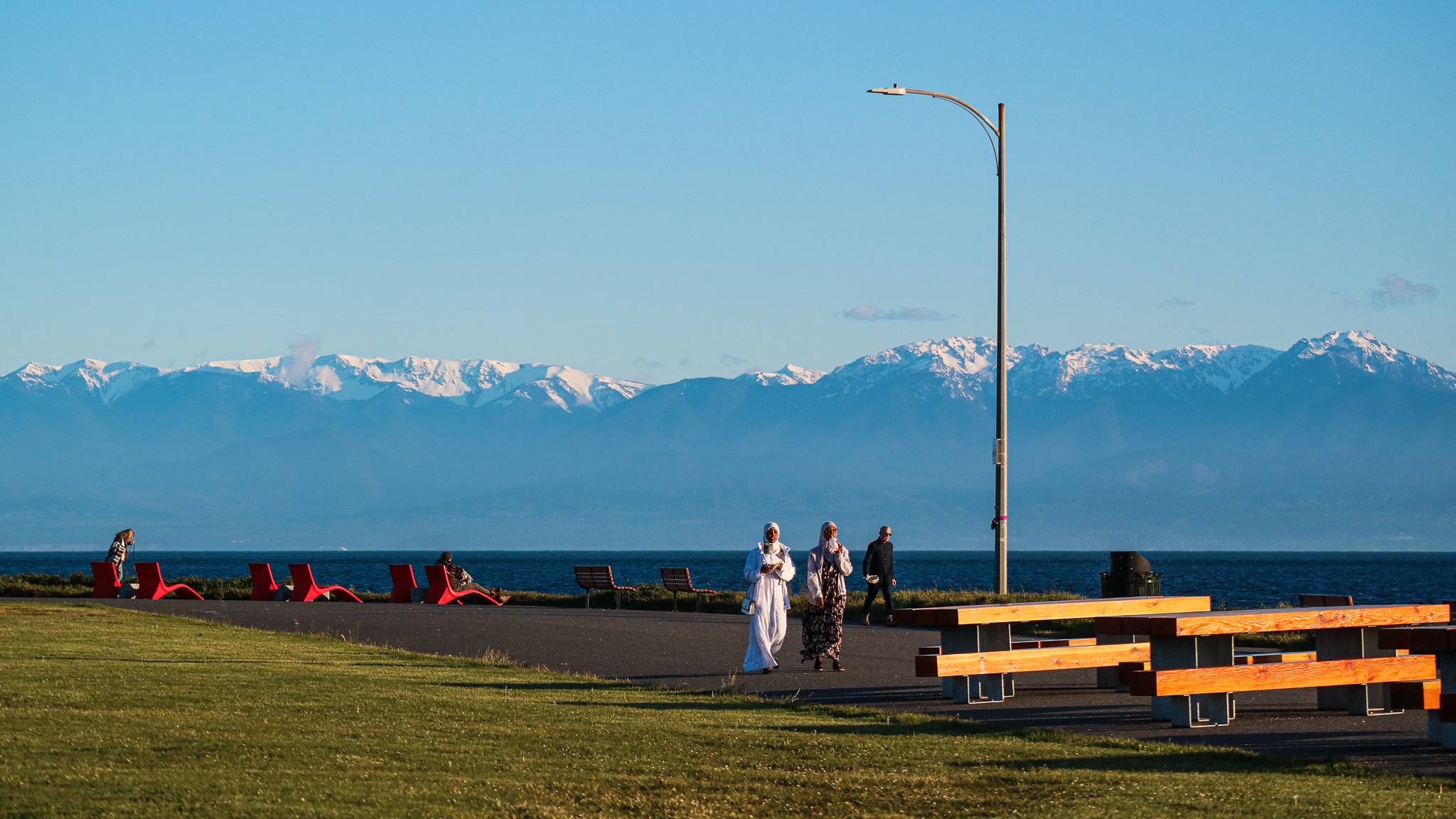
Picnic tables installed in an accessible and pedestrian-friendly space on Clover Point, in Victoria BC. The Olympic mountain range in Washington State is visible to the south, across the Strait of Juan de Fuca.

In 2021, a redesign was planned by the city where half of the loop open to cars would be converted into a space for pedestrians. These proposed changes had an estimated cost of $275,000. Similar changes were first proposed by a city councillor in 1992. The COVID-19 pandemic resulted in a delay in the redesign's implementation. The planned redesign included public washrooms, increased picnic space, a drinking fountain, and reduced parking spaces from 90 to 17. Painting and "pavement play" features on the pedestrian side of the park were rejected by the city council as an unnecessary expense. The redesign was criticized for its approach to accessibility by community advocates. As of May 2025, Clover Point hosts regular monthly meetups for families and children in the space formerly reserved for on-street parking.

== See also ==
- Beacon Hill Park
- Edward Gibbon Wakefield
