= Joseph Clover (artist) =

English portrait painter (1779–1853)

- Born: baptised 19 September 1779; Aylsham, Norfolk
- Died: April 28, 1853
- Education: Trained by John Opie
- Known for: Portrait painting
- Movement: Norwich School of painters

Joseph Clover (baptised 19 September 1779 – 28 April 1853) was an English portrait painter and a member of the Norwich School of painters. He was born in Aylsham, in the English county of Norfolk, one of the twelve children of Thomas and Ann Clover, who owned a drapery business in the town. Few details of his early years are known. He was engaged to be married, but his fiancée, a local girl, died in 1801. He started his career as an engraver but was advised to give it up. Inspired to turn to portrait painting when the artist John Opie painted one of his relatives, he became Opie's pupil, and studied under him for four years. His paintings often use a generous amount of paint, handled freely in a fashion that was characteristic of Opie.

Clover inherited property and was paid well for his commissioned works. He lived an uneventful and comfortable life, mainly in London, where he was a prominent member of the Swedenborgian New Church. In 1809, he was selected to portray three of the mayors of Norwich, the decision based in part on his works exhibited at the Royal Academy that year. In 1811, he staged an exhibition of his works in Norwich. Although known during his life as a portrait painter, Clover also produced accomplished landscape paintings for his own pleasure.

== Life and career ==
=== Early years ===
The Clover family was well known in Norwich and Aylsham, the small Norfolk town where Joseph Clover was born. His grandfather, also called Joseph, was a farrier, who became one of the founders of veterinary medicine. He took up veterinary work in 1765 and was included in Benjamin Gooch's volumes of surgical cases for his treatment of ruptured tendons.

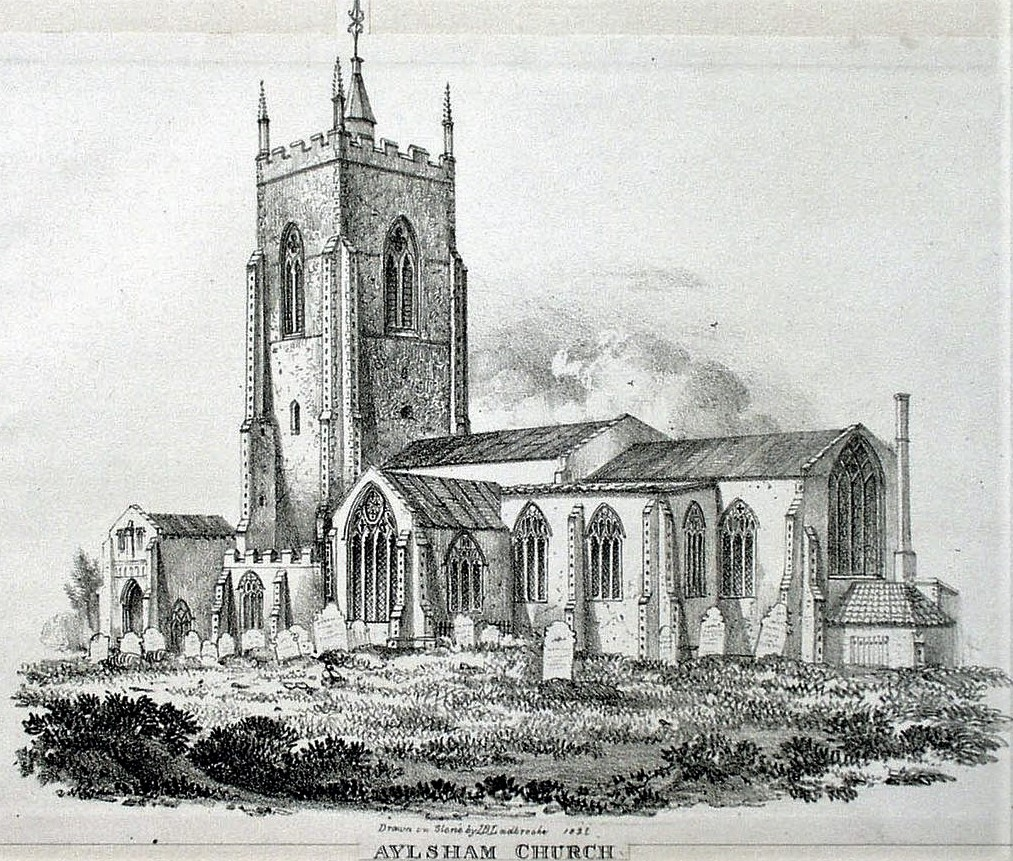
John Berney Ladbrooke's lithograph of Aylsham Church (1823). Clover was baptised at the church in 1779.

Clover was born in Aylsham in 1779, and was christened on 19 September by his parents, Thomas Clover and Ann Barnard. The family lived at Millgate, to the north of the town centre. Thomas Clover set up a drapery business in Aylsham, with a shop on the corner of the town's market square and Hungate Street. He later became a landowner and a farmer. Of the twelve children, of Thomas and Ann Clover, three died when they were infants, and six others died before they were aged 21, as testified by the family headstone in the parish churchyard at Aylsham. The three siblings who survived were Joseph and two other brothers, John Wright and Thomas.

=== Life in London ===
Clover was engaged to be married to Ann Berry, the daughter of Mary and John Berry of Aylsham. After her death aged 20 in 1801, (Note: A person named Ann Berry, the daughter of Mary Berry, died in Norwich in 1797.) Clover never again considered marriage. Mary Berry inherited land and property in the town. For reasons that are not clear, all of her land was bequeathed to Clover in 1820. (Note: Clover sold the land to a stonemason named John Freeman in 1840; the Stonemason's Arms public house was built on a part of the land in 1846.) He also inherited property from his father.

Clover's address in 1813 is given as Mr. Cussack's, No. 2, Uppermarket, Norwich. Although he lived at times during his working life in Norwich, from 1816 to 1848, he preferred to live in London. He lived at 85, Newman Street, where, for a short period, he shared lodgings with another Norfolk artist, James Stark.

Thomas Clover introduced the Swedenborg Society to Norwich after attending its lectures in London, and Clover was influenced by his father to join the Society. Joseph Clover became a prominent member of the Swedenborgian New Church in London. He was on the committee of the church's Argyle Society for several years and was appointed as one of the trustees of the society's property in 1834. (Note: The Swedenborgian churches in Norwich, Aylsham and London all had connections with the Clover family. A New Jerusalem House was built in Aylsham for Swedenborgians. Located where the Baptist chapel now stands, it was built by 1791.)

Clover travelled around Great Britain and Europe. The sketches he produced during a trip to Northumberland can be used to trace his journey as if he had used a camera. In 1816, following the defeat of Napoleon, Clover made a journey to Paris.

A close acquaintance of Clover was the Norwich artist and picture frame maker John Thirtle, whose frames he bought for some of his own works. Clover was socially connected with two eminent Norfolk families that Thirtle knew professionally, and he may have recommended other clients to Thirtle. Clover's nephew was the anaesthetist Joseph Thomas Clover.

=== Last years ===
In 1845, Clover was suddenly paralysed in the left-hand side of his body. He recovered enough to walk again, and to attend church, but after his death in 1853 it was observed by the Swedenborgian Society that "for some time back his sphere of usefulness had been decreased". A week before Clover died, he fell ill with influenza. He died at his Newman Street lodgings on 28 April 1853, aged 74. His executors were Joseph Clover and Joseph Thomas Clover. The New Church obituary noted that "from his modest and gentlemanly deportment, and his tender consideration for the feelings of others, he was always greatly beloved and respected".

== Career ==
Clover started his career as an engraver but was, according to the Norfolk Tour, advised to give up etching. According to the English antiquarian John Chambers, writing when Clover was alive in 1829, on "the advice of a gentleman of the name of Storks [Chambers] took an impression of one of his plates to the late alderman Boydell in Cheapside, whose ingenious remarks on this performance discouraged him from following the profession of engraver". The portraitist John Opie and Clover met when Opie had just completed his civic portrait of the Norfolk textiles merchant John Harvey. Clover was inspired to turn to portrait painting when Opie painted his uncle.

Clover moved from Norfolk to London in c. 1803. There he studied with Opie, working as his assistant for four years. From January 1806 he was also enrolled as a student at the Royal Academy Schools. In the same year he was introduced to the dramatist Richard Cumberland, who invited him to his house at Ramsgate and commissioned him to paint a portrait. The greater the social status of the sitter, the more important the artist chosen to make the portrait — hence, in 1809, Clover, as a young portraitist still being trained, was selected to paint the civic portrait of the relatively unimportant Norwich banker Thomas Back. In 1811, he staged an exhibition of his works at a venue on Elm Hill, Norwich. During his career as a portrait painter, the commissions he obtained provided him with a good income. Among his patrons were the Marquis of Stafford, Lord T. Levison Gower and the Countess de Grey.

Although known during his life as a portrait painter, Clover also produced landscape pictures, described by the art historian Josephine Walpole as being "of variable quality". He toured Wales in 1828, which resulted in a number of watercolours, including a view of Kidwelly Castle, viewed by Walpole as "exceptional". His landscapes were painted for his own pleasure and were not intended to be exhibited or sold.

Clover was an honorary member of the Norwich Society of Arts from 1817 to 1833 but was never a full member. He showed works at the Society's annual exhibitions from 1813 to 1832, exhibiting in total 47 works, nearly all portraits or paintings of figures. During the last years of the Society's existence, he was affluent enough to be able to contribute towards its declining finances. In 1816 and 1817, he exhibited at the Norfolk and Norwich Society of Artists, which had seceded from the Norwich Society of Artists in 1816.

== Works ==
Clover was commissioned by the city of Norwich to portray three of its mayors. In June 1810, it was announced that Clover would paint the portrait of Thomas Back, a decision that was based on his family name being well known in the county, and on the high quality of his exhibited works at the Royal Academy that year. The portrait was exhibited in London in 1811, a year before being put on display in Norwich. Clover was commissioned to paint the portraits of two other civic dignitaries, Barnabas Leman and Crisp Brown, paintings he made in 1813 and 1817. His civic portraits of the mayors of Norwich are still on display in the city's Blackfriars' Hall.

=== Commissioned portraits ===
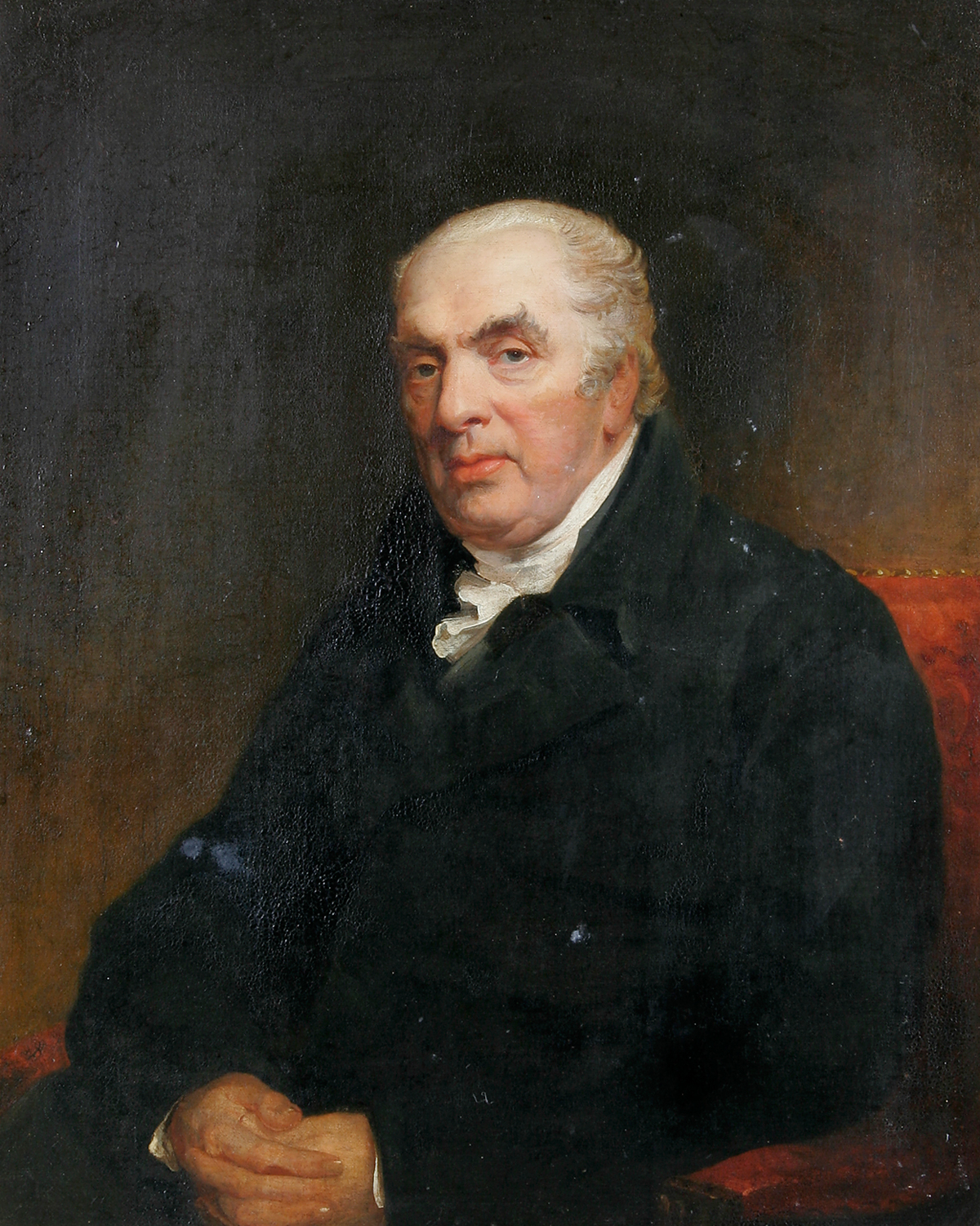
Edward Rigby (1747–1821) (1819), Norfolk and Norwich University Hospital

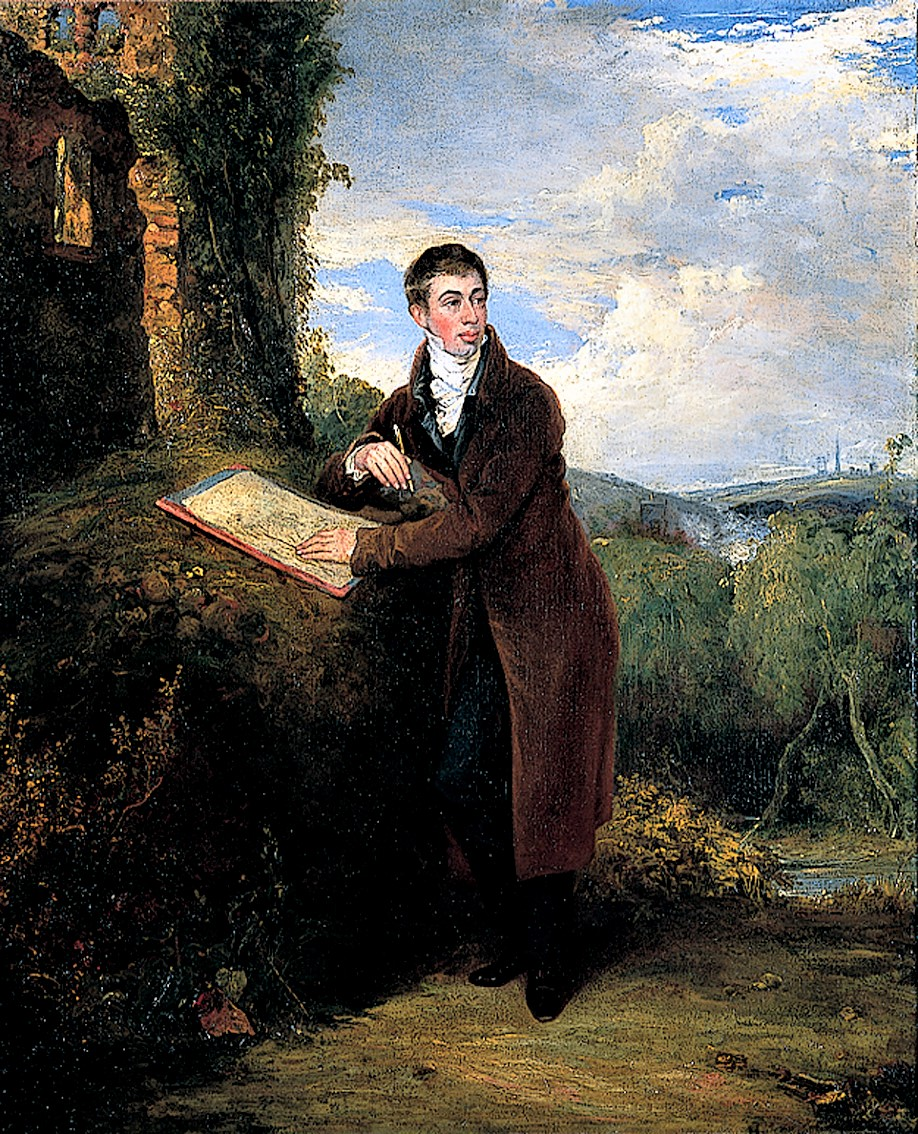
Portrait of George Vincent (1796–1832), with landscape background by himself (undated), Norfolk Museums Collections

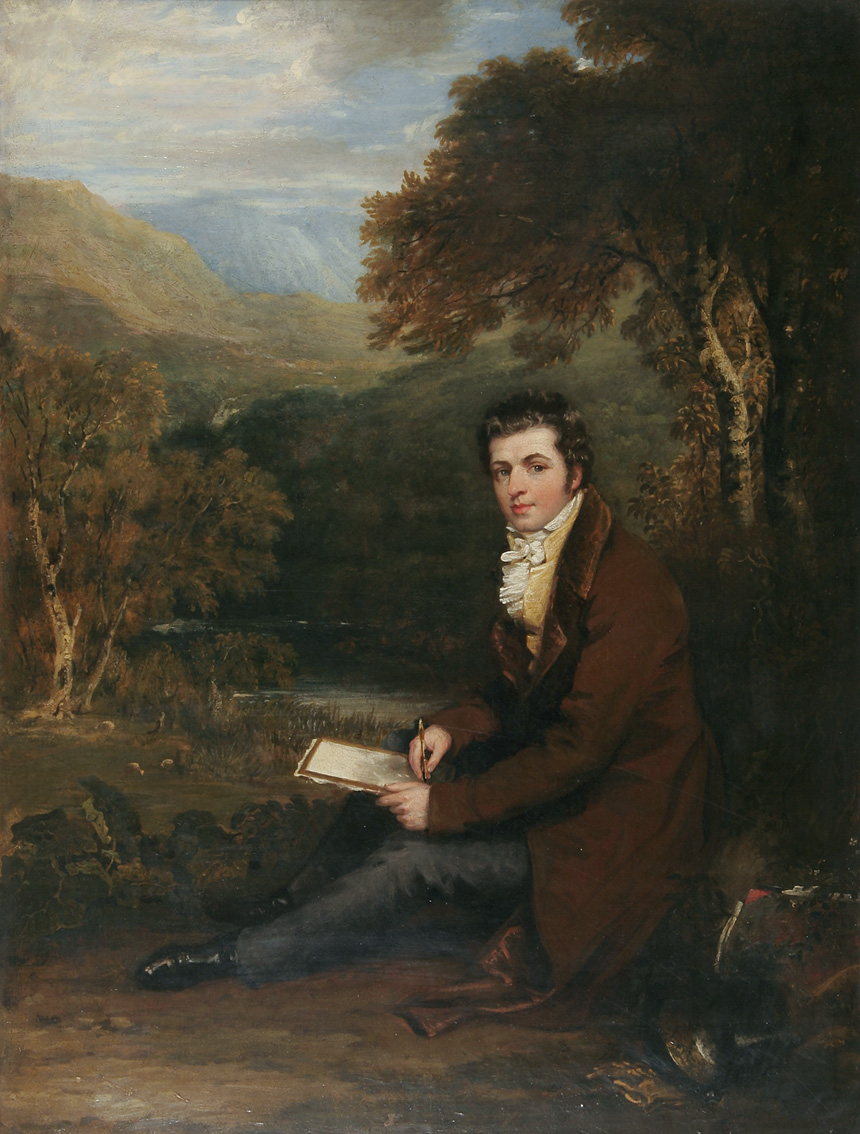
Portrait of James Stark (1794–1859), Landscape by James Stark (undated), Norfolk Museums Collections

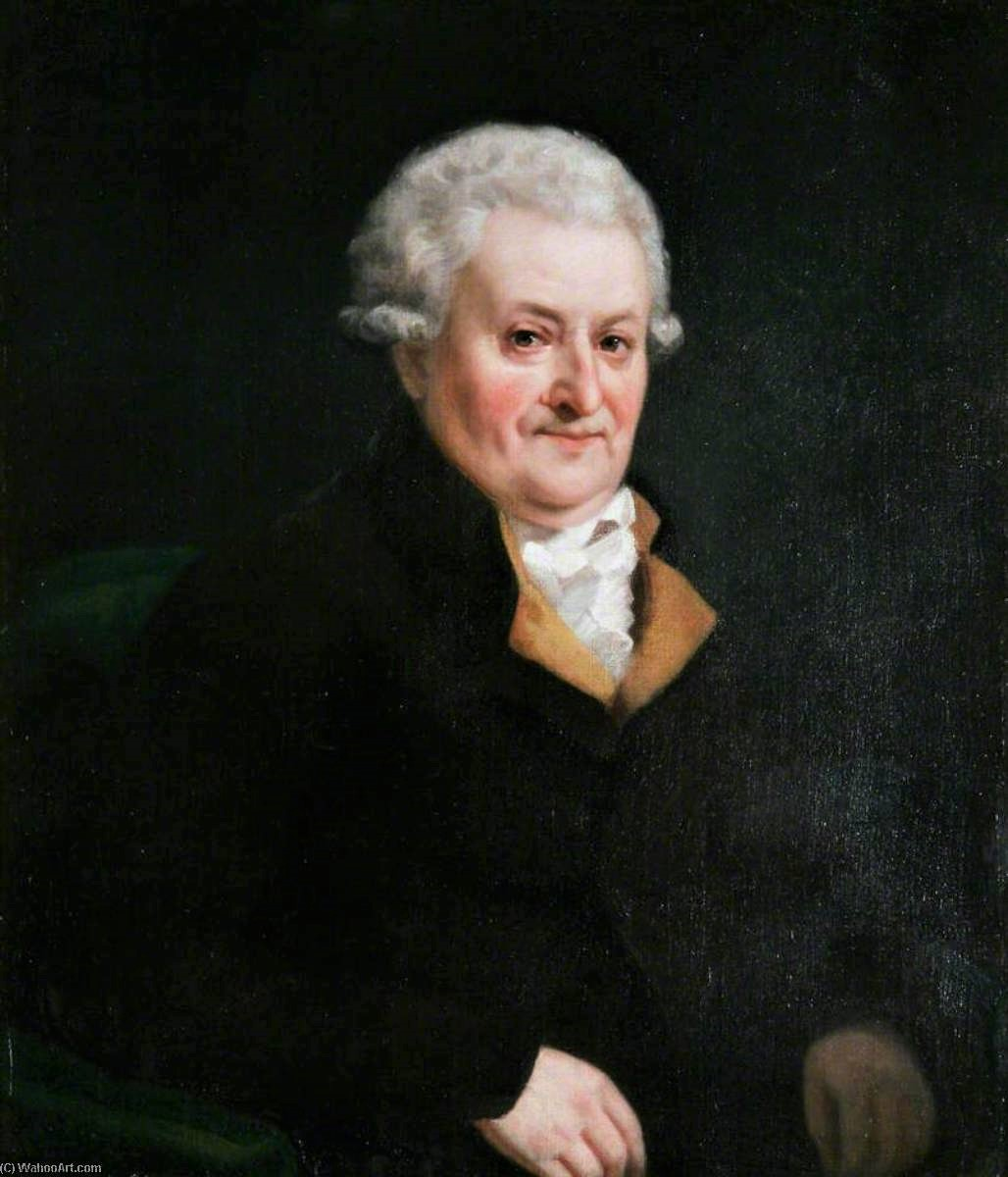
Augustin Noverre (1729–1805) (undated)

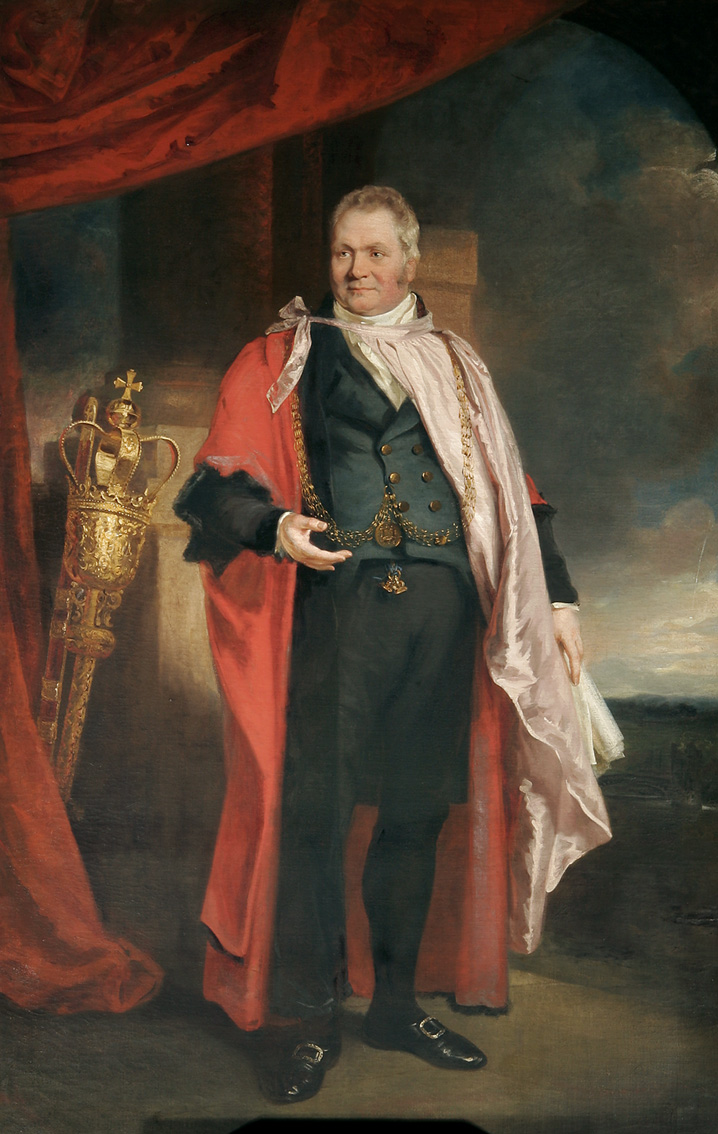
Portrait of Crisp Brown, Mayor of Norwich (1817), Norfolk Museums Collections

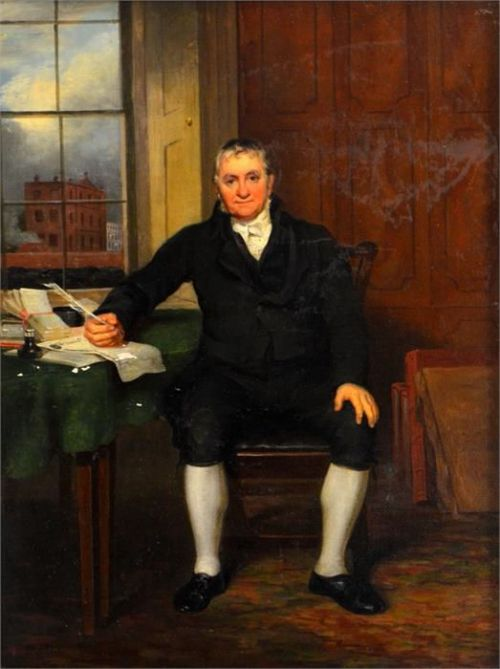
Portrait of John Harris Frewer (1781–1816) Sadler & Brewer Of Norwich, Norfolk Seated At His Desk (c. 1813)

=== The artist's portraits of members of his family ===
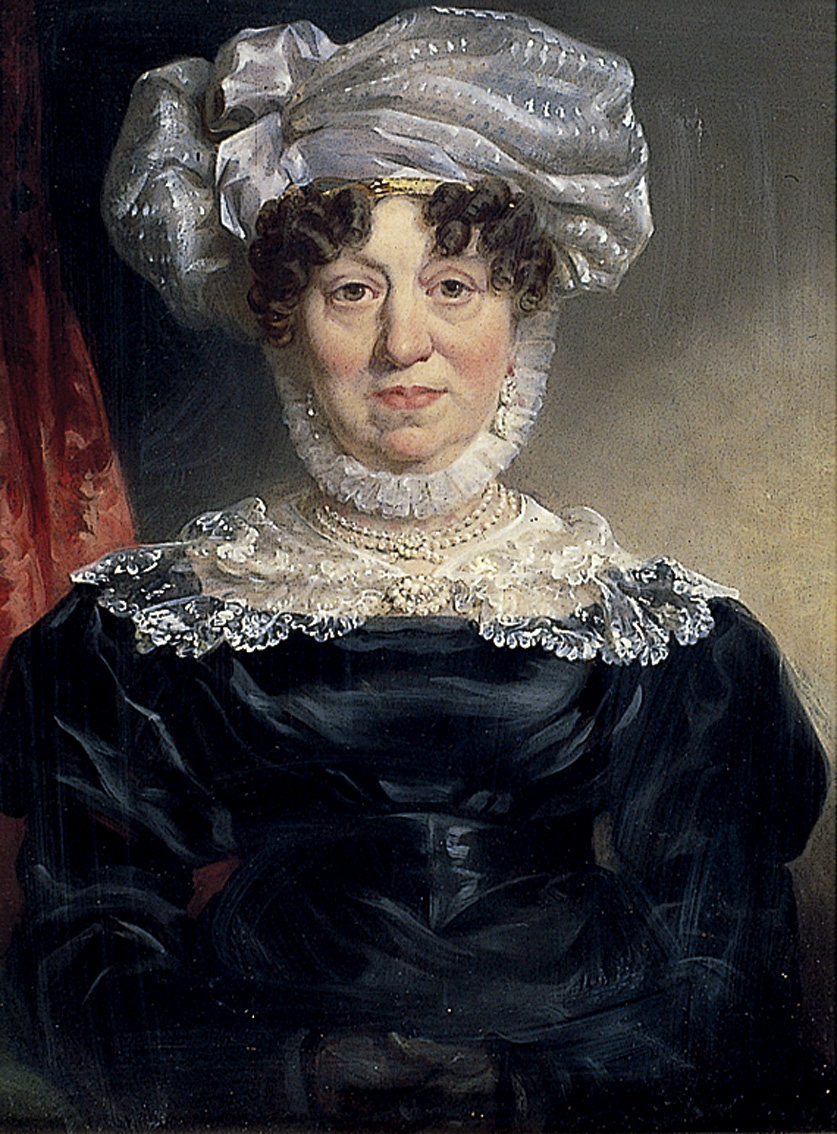
Mrs Withington, Clover's great grandmother (1829), Norfolk Museums Collections

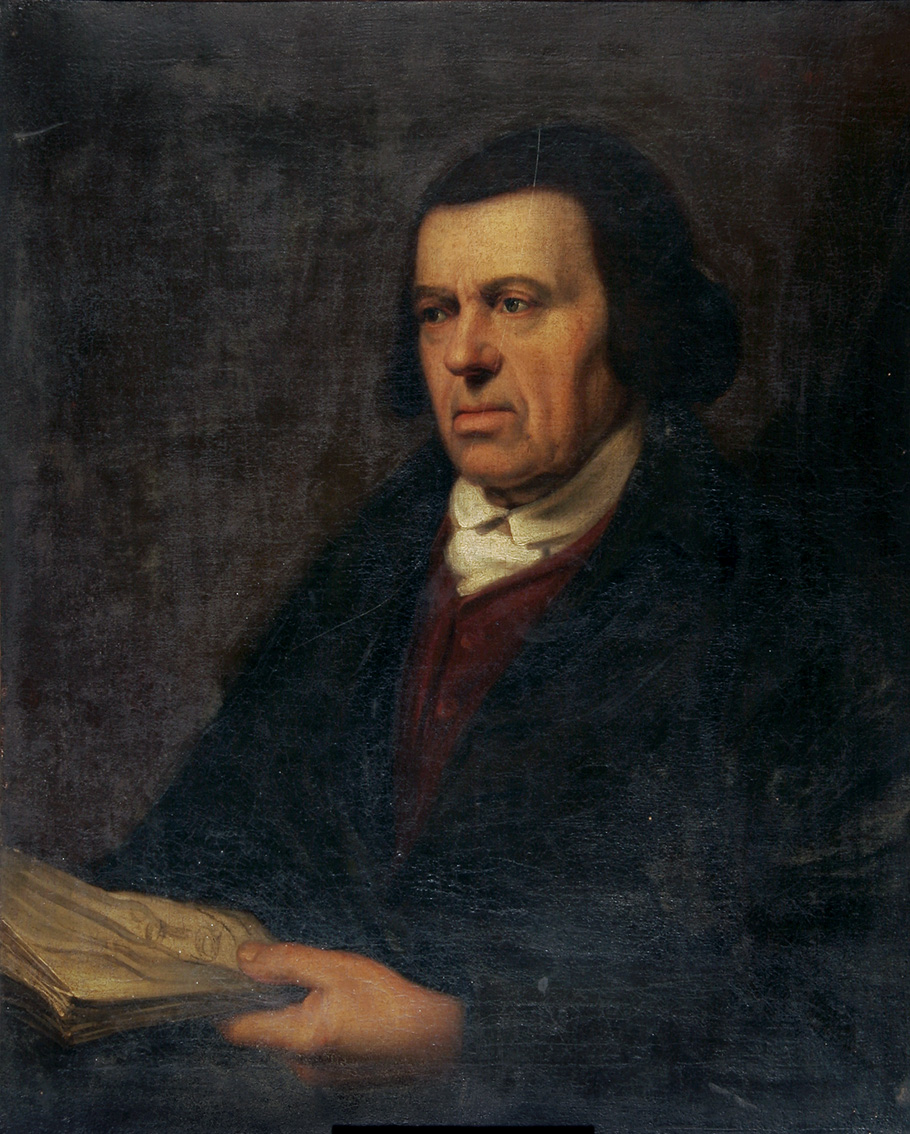
Portrait of Joseph Clover, farrier (1725–1811), grandfather of the artist (undated), Norfolk Museums Collections

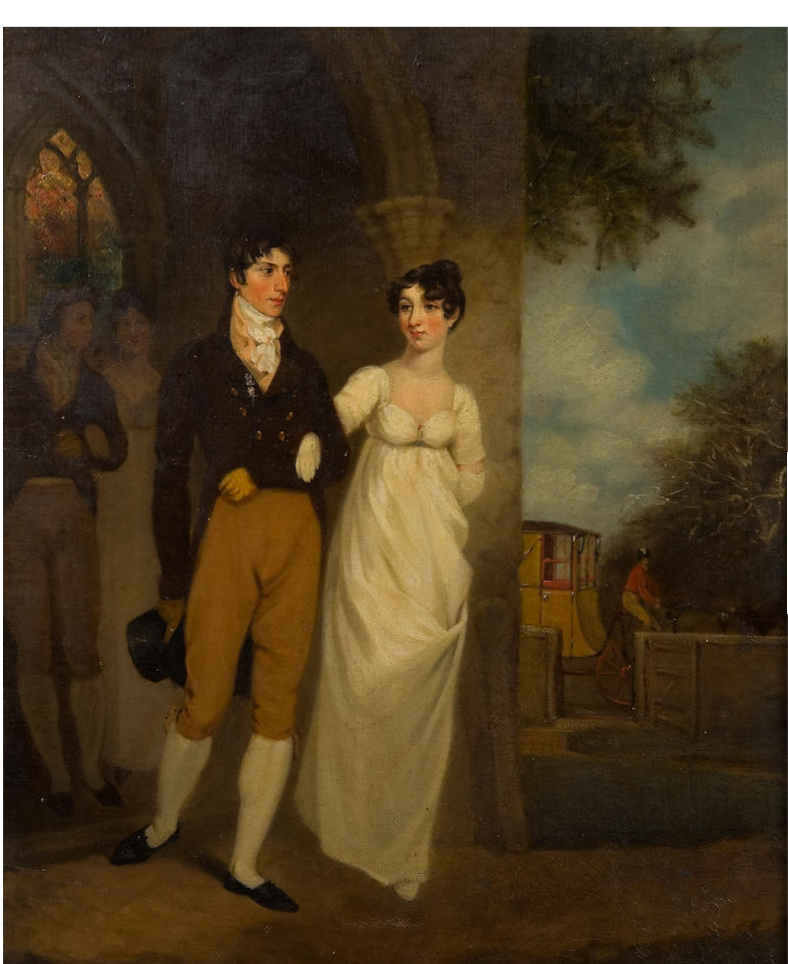
Portrait of the artist's brother and sister-in-law on their wedding day, Thomas and Maria Clover née Cook were married in 1804 (undated)

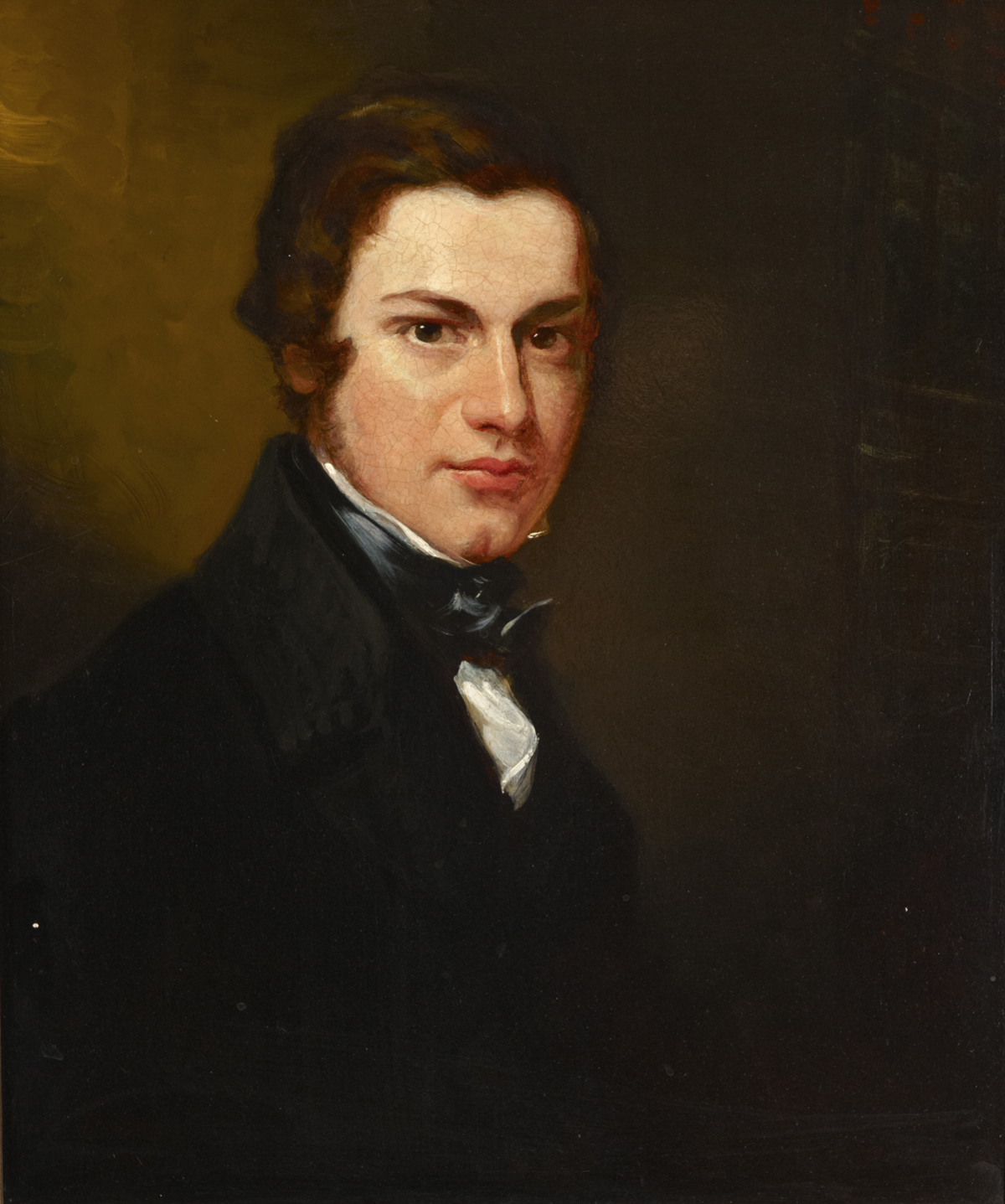
Joseph Thomas Clover (1825–1882), Clover's nephew (undated), Royal College of Anaesthetists

=== Landscapes ===
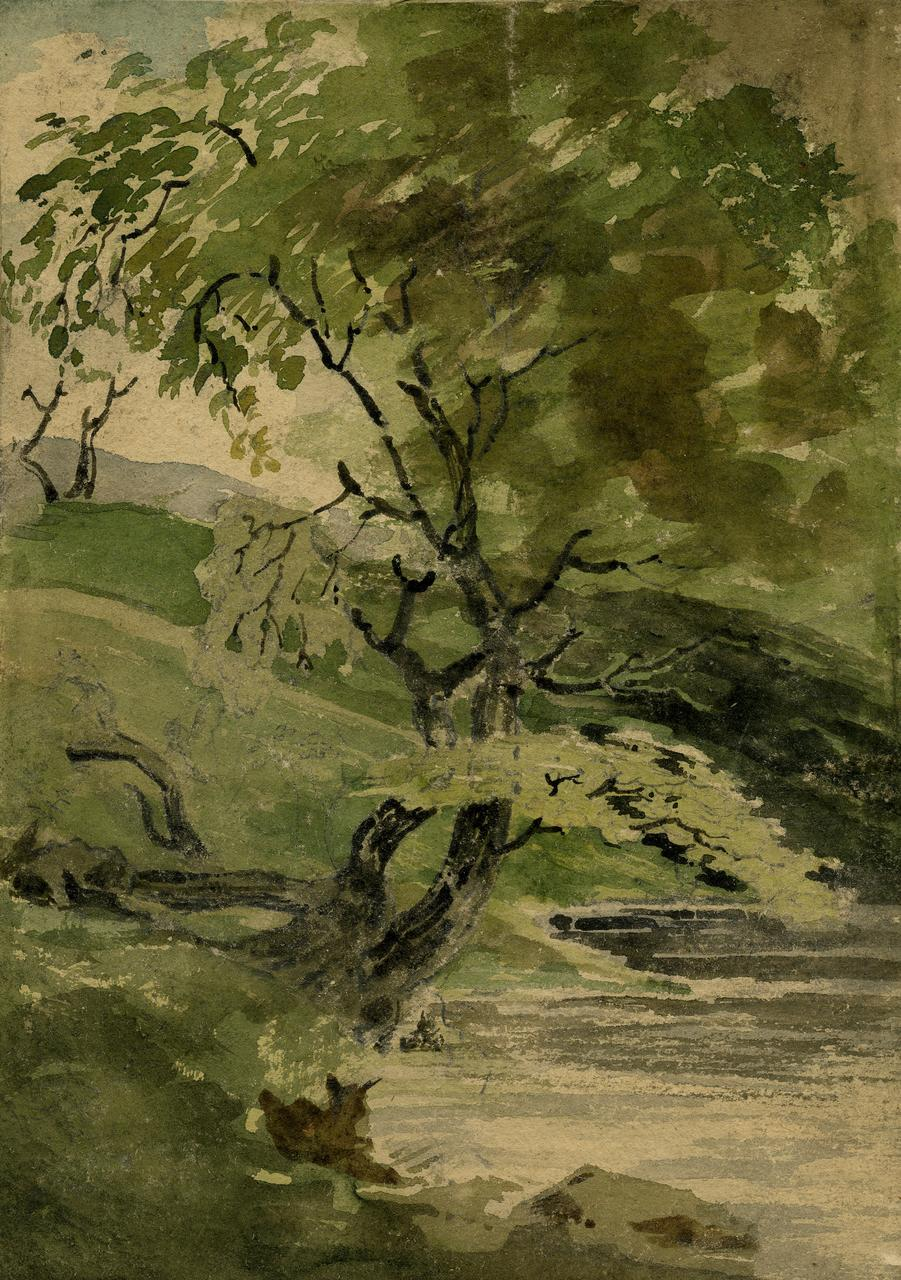
On North Tyne in Chipchase Park, Northumberland–August 1810, Norfolk Museums Collections

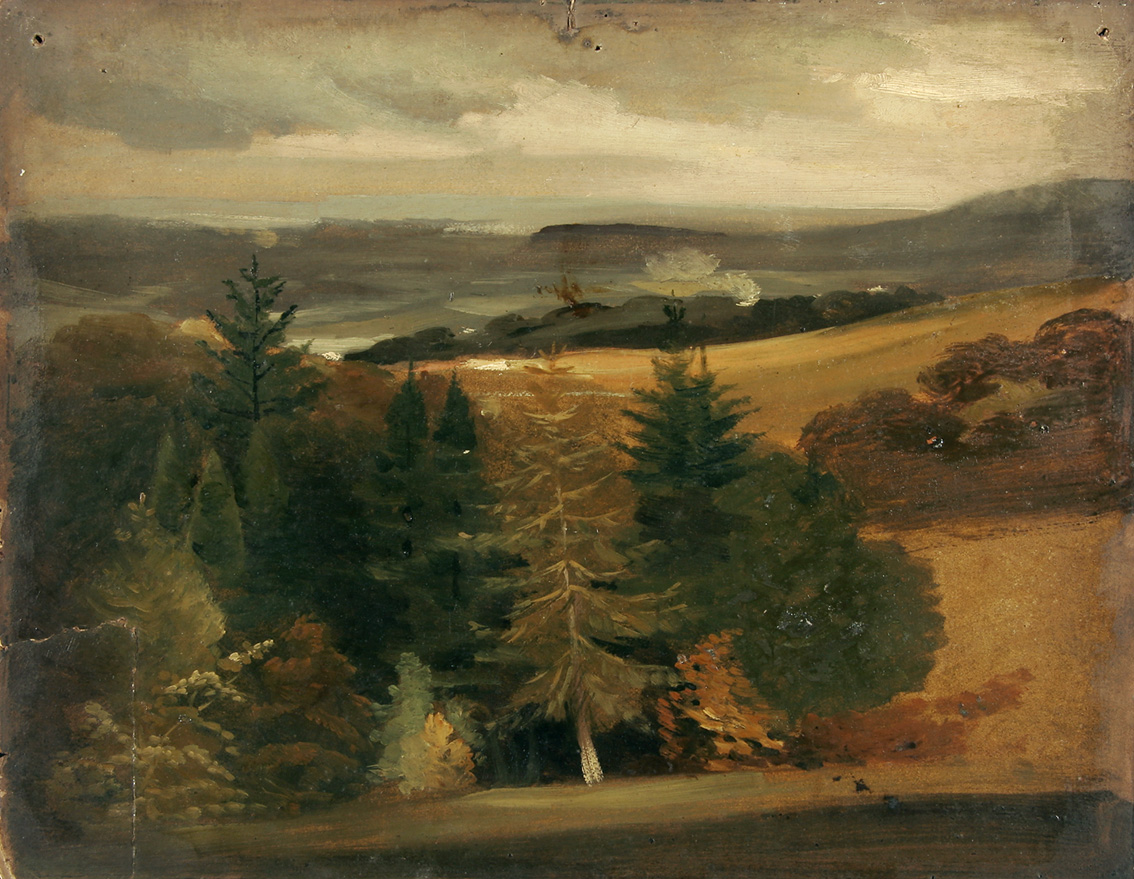
Wooded landscape (undated), Norfolk Museums Collections

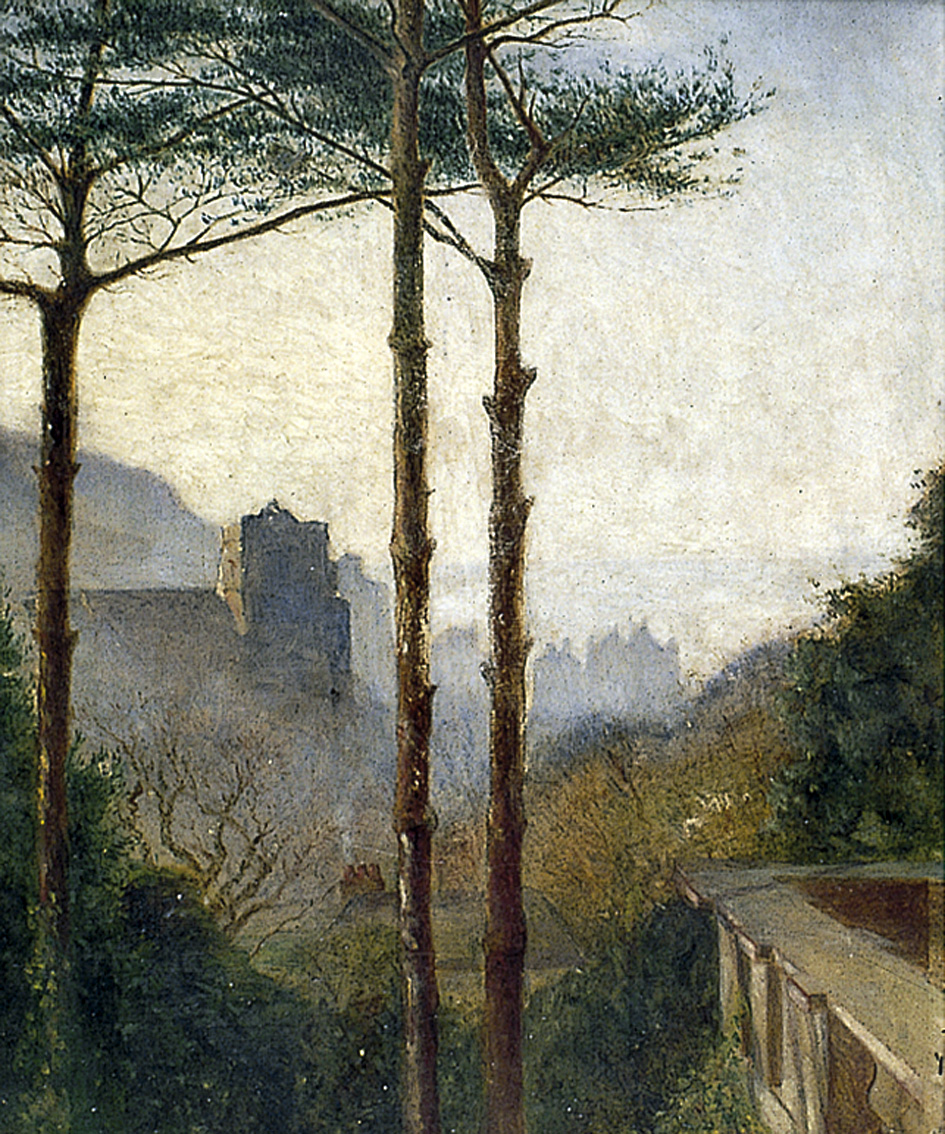
Landscape with church and houses, pines in foreground (undated), Norfolk Museums Collections

== Reputation and artistic style ==
Clover gained a "limited national reputation" as a result of his exhibited works at the Royal Academy and was praised in the local press. In 1830, the Norfolk Chronicle noted, "In portraiture the contributions are numerous. Mr. Clint, Mr. Clover, and Mr. Davis, each in the peculiarity of their respective styles, display proofs of felicity to nature, which we have contemplated with appreciation and with pleasure."

According to Walpole, Clover painted "fairly freely", using a generous amount of paint, whilst also making good use of the white of the paper. Clover's landscapes are praised by the art historian Andrew Moore, who described Clover as "one of the most spontaneous and immediate [landscapists] of the Norwich painters" and noted the influence of Opie in Clover's The Harvesters (1806), which has the free handling of pigment that was characteristic of Opie.

Moore differs in his view of Clover's 1819 portrait of the physician Edward Rigby in the Norfolk and Norwich Hospital, which in his opinion "represents some of the worst aspects of provincial early 19th century".

== Bibliography ==
- Allthorpe-Guyton, Marjorie (1977). John Thirtle, 1777–1839: Drawings in Norwich Castle Museum. London: Norfolk Museums Service. ISBN 978-0-903101-23-3.
- Chambers, John (1829). A General History of the County of Norfolk. Vol. 3. Norwich: J. Stacey. LCCN 02029128.
- Day, Harold (1969). The Norwich School of Painters. Eastbourne: Eastbourne Fine Art. ISBN 978-0-902010-10-9.
- Gale, Elizabeth (2001). Aylsham Inns and Public Houses: a history. Norwich: Elisabeth Gale and Aylsham Local History Society. pp. 79–84. ISBN 978-0-9521564-8-2.
- Lines, Richard (2012). A History of the Swedenborg Society 1810–2010. London: South Vale Press. ISBN 978-1-4710-1274-7.
- Mollard, Tom; Gale, Geoffrey, eds. (2006). Millgate Aylsham (2nd ed.). Cromer, UK: Poppyland Publishers. ISBN 978-0-946148-79-0.
- Moore, Andrew W. (1985). The Norwich School of Artists. Her Majesty's Stationery Office (HMSO); Norwich Museums Service.
- Moore, Andrew; Crawley, Charlotte (1992). Family & Friends: a regional survey of portraiture. London: Her Majesty's Stationery Office (HMSO). ISBN 978-01170-1-506-7.
- Rajnai, Miklos; Stevens, Mary (1976). The Norwich Society of Artists, 1805–1833: a dictionary of contributors and their work. Norwich: Norfolk Museums Service for the Paul Mellon Centre for Studies in British Art. ISBN 978-0-903101-29-5.
- T.C.S. (July 1853). "Obituary". The Intellectual Repository for the New Church, and New Jerusalem Magazine. 14 (163). London: General Conference of the New Church: 284 – via Google Books. Obituary (New Church)
- Shannon, M. (2019). "Artists' Street: Thomas Stothard, R. H. Cromek, and Literary Illustration on London's Newman Street". In Haywood, I.; Matthews, S.; Shannon, M. (eds.). Romanticism and Illustration. Cambridge: Cambridge University Press. pp. 243–266. doi:10.1017/9781108348829.011. ISBN 9781108348829. S2CID 187045125.
- Walpole, Josephine (1997). Art and Artists of the Norwich School. Woodbridge: Antique Collectors' Club. ISBN 978-1-85149-261-9.
- Woollam, Christopher H.M. (1994). "Joseph T. Clover (1825–1882)". Current Anaesthesia & Critical Care. 5 (1): 53–61. doi:10.1016/0953-7112(94)90047-7.
