= Coffee Equipment Company =

US manufacturer of coffee equipment

- Industry: Manufacturing
- Headquarters: Seattle, United States
- Products: Coffee equipment

Clover logo

Coffee Equipment Company was a Seattle-based manufacturer of coffee equipment. The company focused on producing equipment that creates high-quality brewed coffee. It was purchased in 2008 by Starbucks.

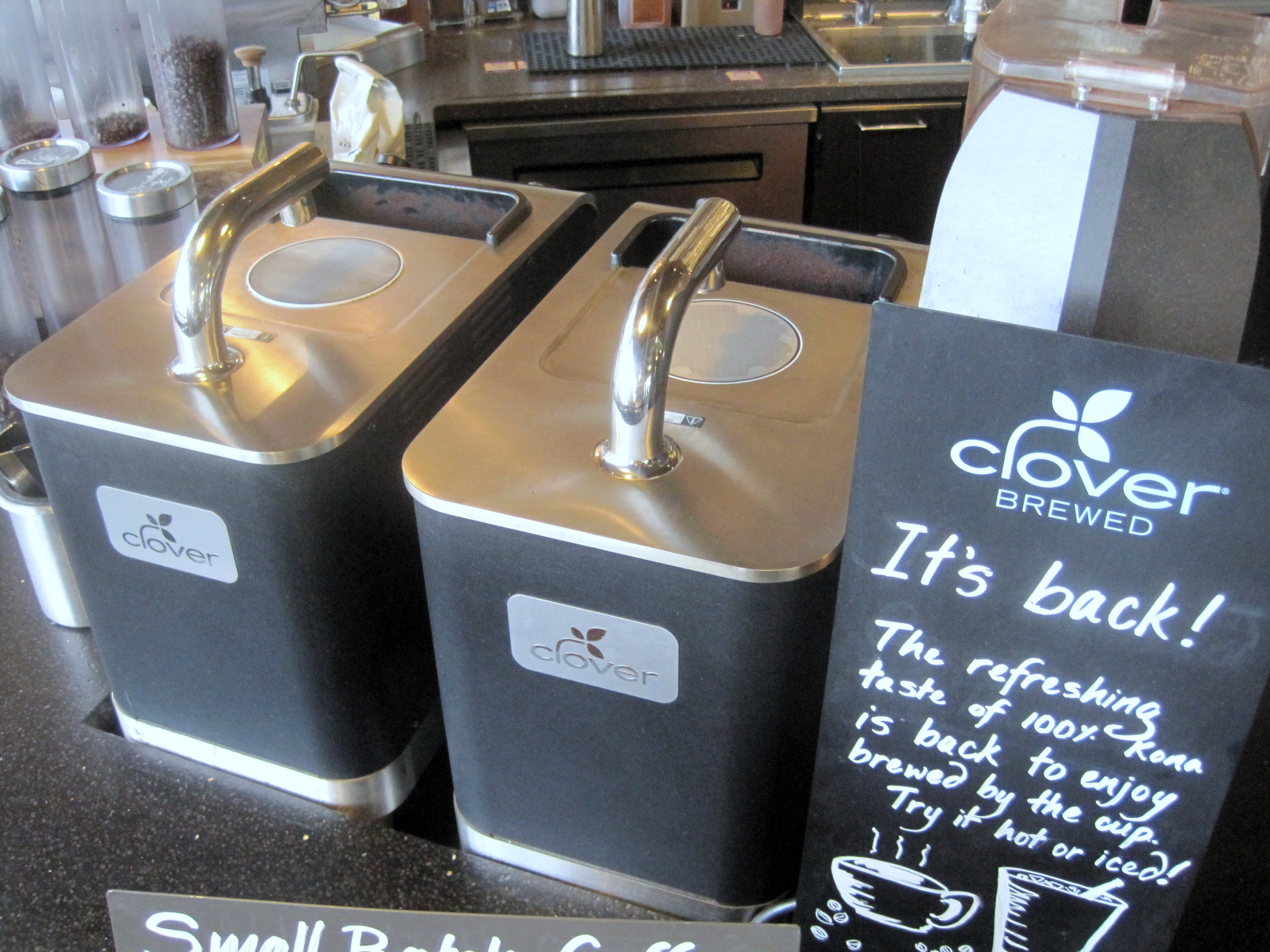
Clover coffee machines

Its first product, the Clover 1s, brewed coffee one cup at a time. The machine combined a method similar to a French press with a vacuum mechanism that separated the liquid from the grounds.

Starbucks CEO Howard Schultz purchased the company after trying a cup brewed by a Clover machine and declaring it to be "the best cup of brewed coffee I have ever tasted".
