= Joseph Clover (farrier) =

English farrier

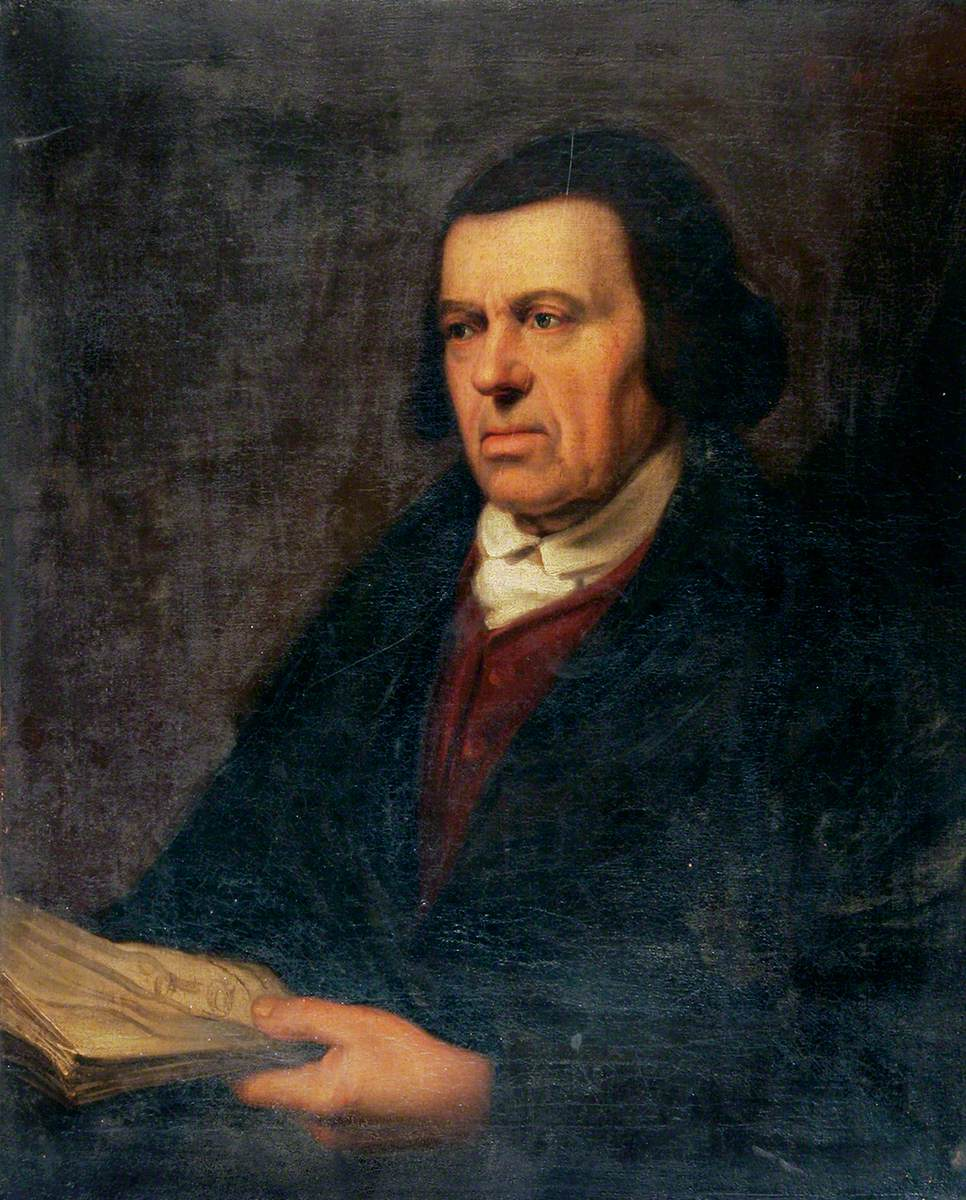
- Clover by his grandson Joseph Clover
- Born: 12 August 1725; Norwich, England
- Died: 19 February 1811 (aged 85); Norwich, England
- Occupation: Farrier

Joseph Clover (12 August 1725 – 19 February 1811) was an English farrier.

== Biography ==
Clover was the son of a blacksmith at Norwich. He was born in that city on 12 August 1725, and followed for many years his father's calling. About 1750 he attracted the notice of Dr. Kervin Wright, a fellow-townsman, by whom he was encouraged to apply himself to the investigation and treatment of the diseases of horses. By dint of extraordinary application he so far mastered Latin and French as to be able to read in the original the best authors on farriery and medicine, particularly Vegetius and La Fosse. He also became a good mathematician. In 1765 his reputation had increased so much that he left off working at the forge to devote himself entirely to veterinary practice. In this he was assisted by many well-known medical men of that day, especially by Mr. Benjamin Gooch, the surgeon, who inserted in his "Cases and Practical Remarks in Surgery" a letter from Clover, giving a description and a drawing of a machine invented by him for the cure of ruptured tendons and fractured legs in horses. As early as 1753 he had discovered the manner in which the larvae of the bots are conveyed from the coat of the horse into the stomach. Ill-health obliged him to decline business in 1781. He died at Norwich on 19 February 1811.

His grandson, Joseph Clover, was an artist.
