= ACE mixture =

Early anesthetic

ACE mixture is an historical anaesthetic agent for general anaesthesia. It was first suggested by George Harley and first used in England around 1860. In 1864 it was recommended for use by the Royal Medical and Surgical Society's Chloroform Committee. It was rarely used after the 19th century, except in Germany, where it was used for slightly longer.

It was a mixture of alcohol, chloroform and ether which gives the mixture its name. Its effects were said to be between that of chloroform and ether and it was used when ether alone was contraindicated. Its boiling point was given as 48 °C (118 °F). Its actual safety margin over its components alone was marginal.

== Usage ==
ACE mixture was most commonly made up in the ratio: 1 part alcohol, 2 parts chloroform, and 3 parts ether although other ratios existed. See 'other preparations' below.

Chloroform (which was first used in 1847) used on its own produces myocardial depression, however the excitatory properties of the alcohol and ether contained with the chloroform in the ACE mixture was believed to reduce this. However, some did question this experimentally at the time.

Many anesthetists favored ACE mixture and one author in 1887 in the British Medical Journal considers the ACE mixture, at the time, the best anesthesia for general use and use in childbirth. He states one downside; the "excited" state of patients on regaining consciousness after the anesthetic, due to the alcohol in the mixture. Another downside of the mixture, as with most anesthetics at the time, was its high flammability.

Deaths have been known to occur from the mixture. However, fewer deaths from ACE mixture were reported than deaths from chloroform or ether.

=== Other preparations ===
After widespread use of ACE mixture, anaesthetists would try different mixtures for different patients and different procedures. CE mixture omitted the alcohol and AC mixture omitted the ether. One doctor described using equal parts alcohol and chloroform in minor operations, but chloroform with Eau de Cologne (which has a high alcohol content) in dental procedures for a more pleasant experience.

Despite the similar names, the anaesthetic mixture named "bichloride of methylene" did not contain the actual compound that would be called bichloride of methylene (Dichloromethane CH_{2}Cl_{2}). Instead, it was later discovered as a mixture of chloroform and alcohol marketed as the bichloride of methylene and even given the formula CH_{2}Cl_{2}.

Other mixtures were:

Preparation Name	as written in source	Reduced ratio of Alcohol	Reduced Ratio of Chloroform	Reduced Ratio of Ether
Common mixture	1 part alcohol, 2 parts chloroform, and 3 parts ether	1	2	3
Richardson's mixture	20 parts alcohol, 12 chloroform and 8 ether	5	3	2
Vienna mixture	0 parts alcohol, 31 parts chloroform and 23 parts ether	0	31	23
Billroth's mixture	1 part alcohol, 3 part chloroform and 1 part ether	1	3	1
Linhart's Mixture	20% alcohol with chloroform	1	4	0
Methylene ("Bichloride of methylene")	30% methylic alcohol and 70% chloroform	3	7	0

Not included in table as they include petroleum ether in addition to diethyl (sulphuric) ether:

Schleich's solutions for general anaesthesia (number one for light anaesthesia and number three for deep anaesthesia):

No 1: 45 parts chloroform, 180 parts sulphuric ether, 15 parts petroleum ether.
No 2: 45 parts chloroform, 150 parts sulphuric ether, 15 parts petroleum ether.
No 3: 30 parts chloroform, 80 parts sulphuric ether, 15 parts petroleum ether.

Wertheim's solution: 1 part chloroform, 1 part petroleum ether and 2 parts sulphuric ether

=== Usage in animal testing ===
ACE mixture was also used to anaesthetise animals, including in preparation for vivisection.

== Method of administration ==
ACE mixture could be given through drops (from a drop bottle) on a piece of lint (a towel), in a Rendle's mask, a cone, or through an inhaler.

Inhalers included: Allis' inhaler, Junker's inhaler (with a funnel mask) for children, Clover's inhaler with bag removed (this inhaler has to be constantly lifted from the face to allow 'free air' to be admitted). Ellis proposed an inhaler to blend vapours in exact proportions, however it was impractical, but Gwathmey modified his idea and created a practical apparatus. Tyrrell created a similar idea called the 'Tyrrell's double-bottle method'.

== See also ==
- Compound spirit of ether
