= Lanning Roper =

American landscape architect

Lanning Roper (4 February 1912 – 22 March 1983) was an American landscape architect and writer who studied and lived in England.

== Early life and education ==
He was born in West Orange, New Jersey, the son of Willet Crosby Roper (1877–1966), an investment banker, and Florence Emily née Eveleth (1874–1961). His maternal grandfather William Hartley Eveleth (1840–1922) was the Superintendent of the college grounds for Harvard University and Radcliffe College. Roper received an honors degree in Fine Arts from Harvard University in 1933.

=== Work ===
Roper had many garden commissions all over England, and some in Ireland (including Castlemartin), France, Italy, Switzerland and the United States. He was commissioned as Prince Charles' landscape gardener in 1981 to do the grounds at Highgrove House in the Cotswolds. From 1951 to 1957 was on the staff of the Royal Horticultural Society as Assistant to the Editor.

== Military service ==
He served in the US Navy in World War II, and was in charge of Division 67 on D-Day.

== Personal life ==
In 1952 he married artist Primrose Harley (1908–1978), daughter of Professor (Edward) Vaughan Berkeley Harley MD MRCP (1863–1923) and Mary Blagden (1869–1936). Her paternal grandfather was George Harley and Ethel Brilliana Tweedie was an aunt. Primrose had previously married and divorced from Lt Col John Alfred Codrington (1898–1991), son of Lt-Gen Sir Alfred Edward Codrington.

=== Publications ===
Roper wrote seven books, including Successful Town Gardening, Hardy Herbaceous Plants, The gardens in the Royal park at Windsor and On gardens and gardening.

=== Memories ===
The Lanning Roper Memorial Garden at the Trinity Hospice on Clapham Common, London, was originally designed by Roper and constructed after his death. The woodland walk at the Farnsworth House in Plano, Illinois now bears his name, and at Scotney Castle in Lamberhurst, Kent in England, a streamside walk is dedicated to Roper’s memory.

=== Death ===
Roper died in Paddington, London.

== Scholarship ==
A book titled Lanning Roper and his Gardens was written by Jane Brown in 1987.
