= Postage stamps and postal history of the North German Confederation =

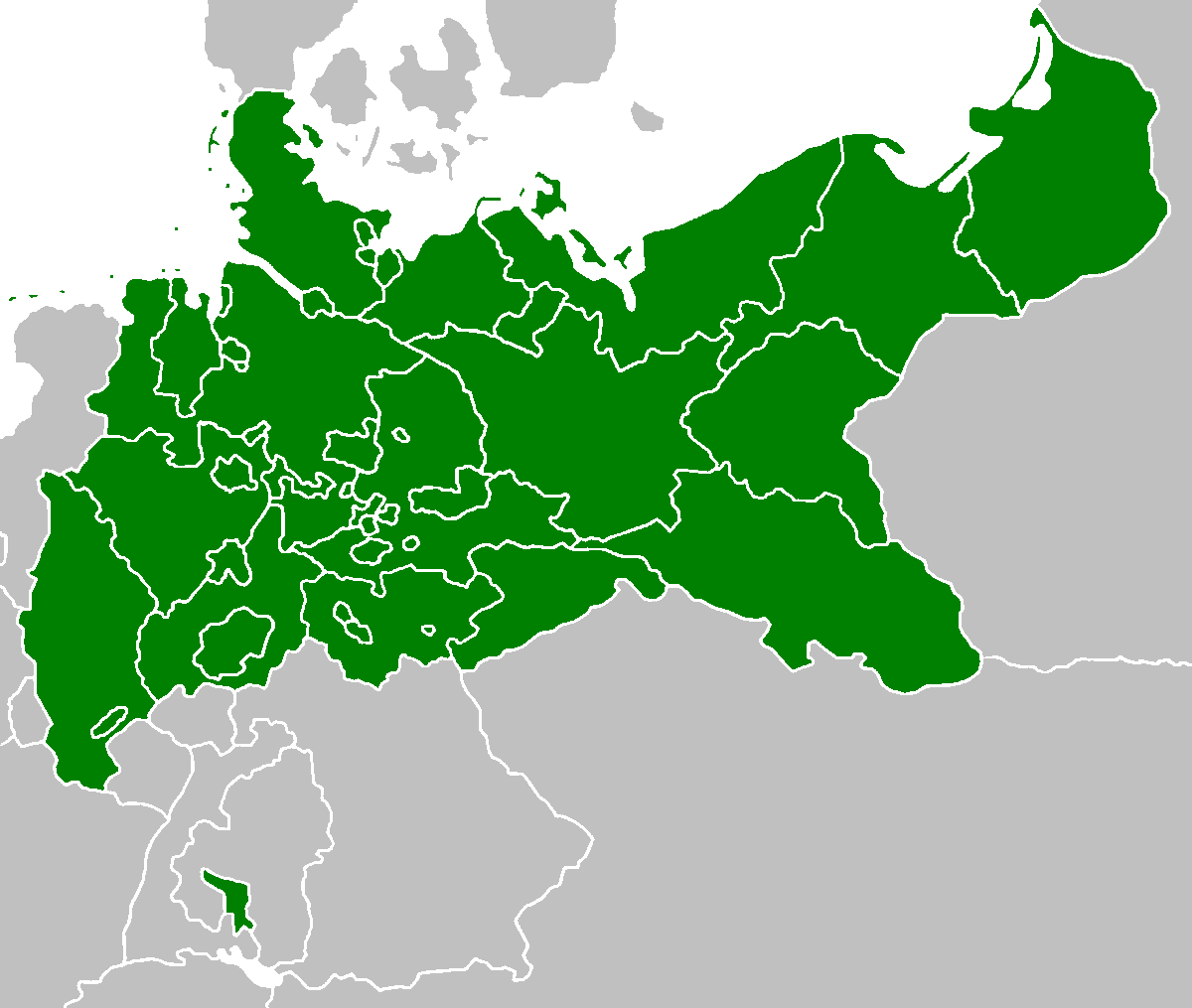
North German Confederation

One of the functions of the North German Confederation was to handle the mail and issue postage stamps, which it began doing, by means of the North German Postal Union (Norddeutscher Postbezirk), on 1 January 1868.

To accommodate the different monetary systems in use by the various states, it issued a series valued in groschen for the Northern District, and another using kreuzer for the Southern District, distinguishing them by framing the value number in a circle for the groschen stamps, and in an oval for the kreuzers. All of these stamps were inscribed "NORDDEUTSCHER POSTBEZIRK".

In addition, there was a special quarter-schilling stamp for Hamburg, with the additional inscription "STADTPOSTBRIEF HAMBURG".

Early in 1869 the stamps were issued with perforations, the previous issues having been rouletted. On 1 March, 10 gr and 30 gr values were issued, notable for being printed on goldbeater's skin, a scheme to prevent reuse of these high-value stamps.

Confederation stamps were superseded on 1 January 1872 by the first issues of the German Empire.

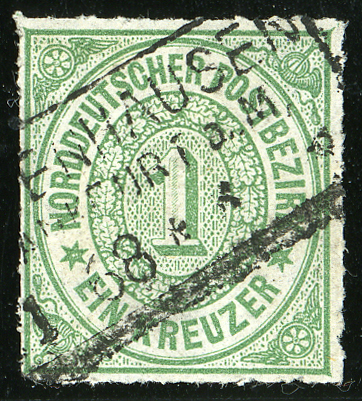
1868, Southern District, 1 kreuzer, rouletted

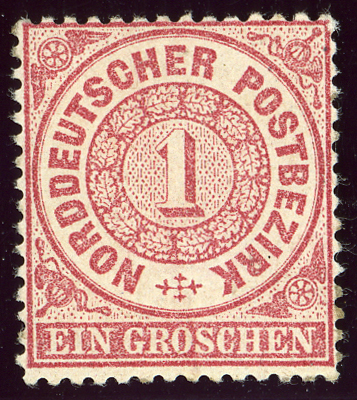
Northern District, 1 Groschen, perforated issue 1869

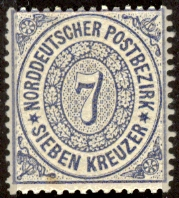
Southern District, 7 Kreuzer perforated issue 1869

== Coverage ==
The coverage of the North German Postal Union was described as follows:

The federal territories comprise Anhalt, Bremen, Brunswick, Hamburg, Lippe, Lübeck, Mecklenburg-Schwerin, Mecklenburg-Strelitz, Oldenburg, Prussia together with Lauenburg, Reuss senior line, Reuss junior line, Saxe-Coburg-Gotha, Saxe-Meiningen, Grand Duchy of Saxony, Kingdom of Saxony, Schaumburg-Lippe, Schwarzburg-Rudolstadt, Schwarzburg-Sondershausen, Upper Hesse (part of Hesse north of the Main), and Waldeck.

Upper Hesse was administered as part of the postal union even though the Grand Duchy of Hesse was not a member of the North German Confederation.

== Bibliography ==
- Altdeutschland Spezial-Katalog und Handbuch, Hans GROBE, 1975
- Scott catalogue
- Stuart Rossiter & John Flower, The Stamp Atlas
