= Vaughan Harley =

British pathologist (1864–1923)

Edward Vaughan Berkeley Harley MRCP (28 December 1864 – 21 May 1923), was Professor of Pathological Chemistry at London University from 1896 to his retirement in 1919.

== Life ==
He was the son of the physician George Harley (1829–1896) and Emma Jessie née Muspratt (1835–1919) and brother of Ethel Brilliana Tweedie.

Vaughan studied medicine at the University of Edinburgh, graduating with an MBCM in 1887; and MD with gold medal in 1891. After travelling the world for a couple of years he studied in Paris with Louis Pasteur and Pierre Paul Émile Roux, in Leipzig with Carl Ludwig, in Turin with Angelo Mosso, in Vienna, Budapest and Christiania. In 1893 he was invited by Victor Horsley at University College to establish the first department of pathological chemistry in England; in 1896, on Horsley's retirement he was appointed to the professorship.

In 1905 he married a renowned beauty, Mary 'Ming' née Blagden (1869–1936), daughter of the Rev Henry Blagden (1832–1922), Hon. Canon of Christ Church, Oxford, and Isabella Catherine née Searight (1845–1923). They had two daughters: Diana Mary 'Dido' Harley (1906–1964) who was the second wife of Brigadier Eric Greville Earle DSO (1893–1965); and Primrose Harley (1908–1978) who married first in 1936 Lt-Col John Alfred Codrington (1898–1991), they divorced in 1942, and in 1952 she married secondly the American landscape architect Lanning Roper (1912–1983).

His London practice was at 25 Harley Street. In 1907 he purchased Walton Hall, Milton Keynes as a country house; he established a farm there where he explored his deep interest in scientific farming and bred prize-winning shorthorn cattle, Oxford Downs sheep, shire horses and Large Black pigs.

He died at Walton Hall in 1923.

== Papers ==
- Harley, Vaughan (1896). "Absorption and metabolism in obstruction of the pancreatic duct". The Journal of Pathology. 3 (3): 245–258. doi:10.1002/path.1700030303.
- Harley, Vaughan; Barratt, Wakelin (1901). "The Experimental Production of Hepatic Cirrhosis". The Journal of Pathology. 7 (2): 203–213. doi:10.1002/path.1700070207.
