= Third Army (Home Forces) =

Third Army was a home service formation of the British Army during the First World War.

Third Army, based at Luton, was formed on 6 September 1914 under the command of Central Force. Sir Alfred Codrington was appointed Army Commander on 30 October after the death of Sir William Franklyn. Units attached to the Army were the East Anglian Division, the North Midland Division, the South Midland Division, the 2nd London Division, the North Midland Mounted Brigade and the 2nd South Western Mounted Brigade.

Third Army kept its name even after the establishment of a Third Army in the British Expeditionary Force in July 1915. It was disbanded on 11 December 1915 following the appointment of Sir John French as Commander-in-Chief, Home Forces.
