= Primrose Harley =

British painter and gardener

- Born: April 19, 1908; Marylebone
- Died: April 22, 1978 (aged 70); London

Primrose Harley became Primrose Roper and Primrose Codrington (19 April 1908 – 22 April 1978) was a British painter and gardener. As an artist she was known for her paintings and murals.

== Life ==
Harley was born on Primrose Day 19 April 1908, at 25 Harley Street, St Marylebone, the London home of her parents Vaughan Harley (1864–1923) and Mary 'Ming' née Blagden (1869–1936). Harley studied at Chelsea Polytechnic, where she was taught by Graham Sutherland, and then attended the East Anglian School of Painting and Drawing under Cedric Morris. She completed a set of murals for Dorland Hall, the then headquarters of British European Airways in Regent Street in central London. During her artistic career Harley exhibited at the Royal Academy in London, with the New English Art Club, the London Group and with the Society of Women Artists.

In 1936 Harley married Lt-Col John Alfred Codrington (1898–1991) a career soldier who had a lifelong interest in plants. They divorced in 1942 and she later married the landscape gardener Lanning Roper (1912–1983) in 1952 and worked with him on his landscaping projects.

Harley died on 22 April 1978 at her home in Chelsea.
