= William Melville Codrington =

British soldier, diplomat and railway officer (1892-1963)

William Melville Codrington MC
- Born: 16 December 1892
- Died: 29 April 1963 (aged 70)
- Relatives: Alfred Codrington (father); John Alfred Codrington (brother)
- Military career
- Allegiance: United Kingdom
- Branch: British Army
- Service years: 1914-1919
- Rank: Captain
- Units: Special Reserve; 16th The Queen's Lancers
- Conflicts: World War I
- Awards: Military Cross

William Melville Codrington (16 December 1892 – 29 April 1963) was a British soldier, diplomat, and railway officer. He served as Chief of Security to the British Foreign Office during the Second World War.

== Life ==
He was the second son of Lieutenant-General Alfred Codrington and his wife Adela Portal.

On 15 August 1914, he was commissioned from the Officers' Training Corps, Territorial Force to become a second lieutenant of cavalry in the Special Reserve of officers. He was promoted to lieutenant in the 16th The Queen's Lancers on 22 February 1915. On 28 December 1915, he was seconded to the Royal Engineers Signal Service. 17 Jan 1918-to be acting captain while commanding a Divisional Signal Squadron.

After the war, he was promoted to a substantive captaincy in the 16th Lancers on 4 May 1919. He was awarded the Military Cross on 3 June 1919, as part of the 1919 Birthday Honours. He was transferred to the reserve of officers of the 16th/5th Lancers on 25 November 1922 when the 16th was amalgamated into that regiment. He resigned his reserve commission on 9 June 1939.

On 23 April 1919, he was appointed a third secretary in HM Diplomatic Service. He was promoted to second secretary on 15 December 1920. He resigned from the diplomatic service in 1925 to become secretary of the Great Western Railway of Brazil.

In 1940, he was appointed Chief of Security to the Foreign Office, an unsalaried post. He was made a Companion of the Order of St Michael and St George on 1 January 1946.

Codrington served on the boards of several railways, including the Great Western Railway in the UK and several systems overseas, including the Nyasaland Railways and some of the Argentine companies nationalised by Juan Perón.

He served as High Sheriff of Rutland in 1947 and as Lord Lieutenant of Rutland from 1951 until his death.

Honorary titles
Preceded by Clarence Campbell Whadcoat	High Sheriff of Rutland; 1947	Succeeded by Rowland Pickering Spence
Preceded by The Earl of Ancaster	Lord Lieutenant of Rutland; 1951–1963	Succeeded by Thomas Charles Stanley Haywood
