= Alfred Codrington =

British Army general (1854–1945)

Lieutenant-General Sir Alfred Codrington GCVO KCB
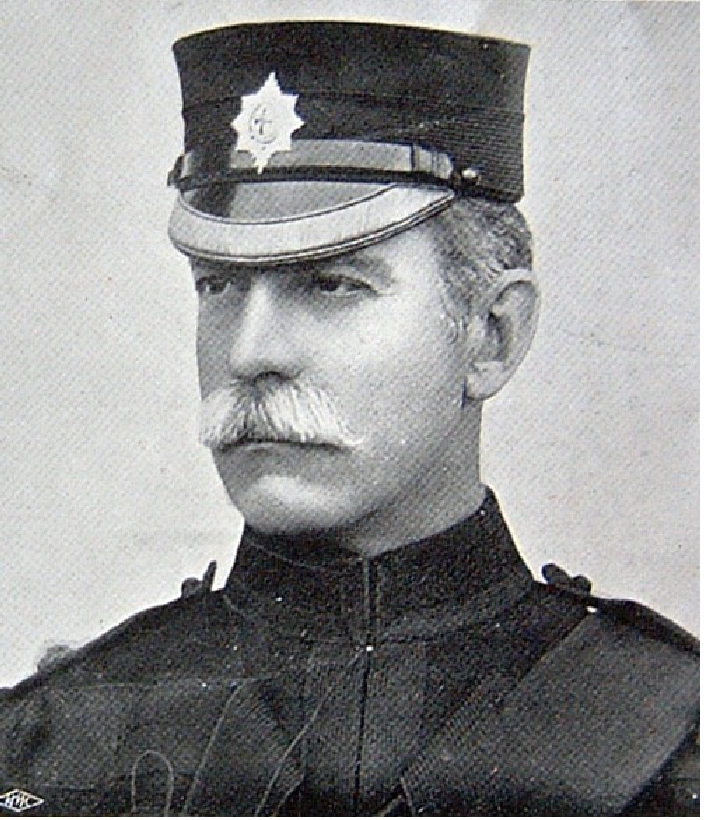
- Codrington in dress uniform, c. 1900
- Born: 4 May 1854
- Died: 12 September 1945 (aged 91)
- Spouse: Adela Harriet Portal (m. 1885; died 1935)
- Children: 3
- Relatives: General Sir William Codrington (father); William Codrington (son); John Codrington (son)
- Military career
- Allegiance: United Kingdom
- Branch: British Army
- Service years: 1873–1918
- Rank: Lieutenant-General
- Units: Coldstream Guards; 3rd Army Corps
- Commands: Third Army; London District; 1st London Division; 1st Battalion Coldstream Guards
- Conflicts: Anglo-Egyptian War; Second Boer War; Battle of Belmont; Battle of Graspan; Battle of Modder River; Battle of Magersfontein; Advance on Pretoria; First World War
- Awards: Knight Grand Cross of the Royal Victorian Order; Knight Commander of the Order of the Bath; Mentioned in Despatches

Lieutenant-General Sir Alfred Edward Codrington, GCVO, KCB (4 May 1854 – 12 September 1945) was a British Army officer who served in colonial wars in Africa during the late nineteenth century, and later commanded a reserve army during the First World War.

== Military career ==
Born in 1854, the second son of General Sir William Codrington, he was educated at Harrow and entered the Coldstream Guards as a lieutenant on 1 February 1873. He first saw active service during the Anglo-Egyptian War of 1882, where he was mentioned in despatches. He was promoted to captain on 18 April 1885, to major on 4 December 1889, and to lieutenant-colonel on 29 September 1898.

He commanded the 1st Battalion Coldstream Guards in the Second Boer War between 1899 and 1902, where he was wounded twice. He took part in the Battle of Magersfontein on 11 December 1899, in which the defending Boer force defeated the advancing British forces amongst heavy casualties for the latter. Codrington was mentioned in the despatch from Lord Methuen describing the battle and how he "though wounded, insisted on remaining in command of his battalion till nightfall". In March 1900 he was stationed at the British camp at Modder River, when he was reported to be with a small party of officers foraging at farms north of Bloemfontein. They were caught by Boer troops, and he was wounded in the leg. He was mentioned in despatches later in the war, and given a brevet promotion as colonel dated 29 November 1900. For his service, he received the Queen's medal with three clasps, and the King's medal with two clasps. After his return to the United Kingdom, he was placed on half-pay as he resigned his command of a battalion on 28 October 1902.

In February 1903 he was appointed assistant adjutant-general in the 3rd Army Corps, stationed in Ireland. He did not stay there long, however, as on 21 August 1903 he was appointed in command of the Coldstream Guards. He was promoted to major general in February 1907. He commanded the 1st London Division of the Territorial Force from March 1908 to 1909, when he was appointed Major-General commanding the Brigade of Guards and general officer commanding (GOC) London District, retiring from this post in 1913. He was promoted on 3 June 1913 to lieutenant general.

He returned to duty after the outbreak of the First World War, serving as the Military Secretary to Lord Kitchener, the Secretary of State for War, from August until October 1914. He was then appointed to command Third Army in the Home Forces; this was based around Luton, and contained four Territorial divisions and two Territorial cavalry brigades. He relinquished command in 1916. He was appointed to sit on a Pensions Appeal Tribunal in the summer of 1917, which dealt with appeals against governmental decisions on military pensions, and later published a book on War Pensions: Past and Present, co-authored with Edward Abbott Parry, another member of the Tribunal.

His final military position was the ceremonial colonelcy of the Coldstream Guards, to which he was appointed in 1918. Unusually, this had been a position previously occupied by his father. He was appointed chairman of the Society of Miniature Rifle Clubs in 1917, and President of the Association in 1932. He also served as the Commissioner for London Boy Scouts from 1917 to 1923.

== Family ==
He married Adela Harriet Portal, the niece of the Earl of Minto, in 1885; she died in 1935. The couple had three sons, Geoffrey, William, and John, and one daughter, Mary. Colonel Sir Geoffrey Codrington became the High Sheriff of Wiltshire and was an usher to both King George VI and Queen Elizabeth II, while William was the Chief Security Officer to the War Cabinet during the Second World War and later High Sheriff of Rutland.

== Notes ==
Military offices
New command	GOC 1st London Division; 1908–1909	Succeeded by Arthur Henniker-Major
Preceded by Sir Frederick Stopford	GOC London District; 1909–1913	Succeeded by Sir Francis Lloyd
Preceded by Sir William Franklyn	Military Secretary; August–October 1914	Succeeded by Sir Frederick Robb
Honorary titles
Preceded by Hon. Bernard Ward	Colonel of the Suffolk Regiment; 1918–1918	Succeeded by Sir Thomas D'Oyly Snow
Preceded by The Viscount Falmouth	Colonel of the Coldstream Guards; 1918–1945	Succeeded by Sir Charles Loyd
