= Chloroform Committee =

The Chloroform Committee was commissioned by the Royal Medical and Chirurgical Society (now known as the Royal Society of Medicine) in 1864 to investigate the use of chloroform. The committee recommended the use of chloroform in the same year (although ether was safer for patients). It was the first of such committees (see the box at the bottom of this page) and concluded that chloroform depresses the action of the heart and frequently kills. One of the members, Joseph Clover, during his time on the committee developed apparatus for using chloroform called the Clover bag.
