= Ethel Brilliana Tweedie =

English painter

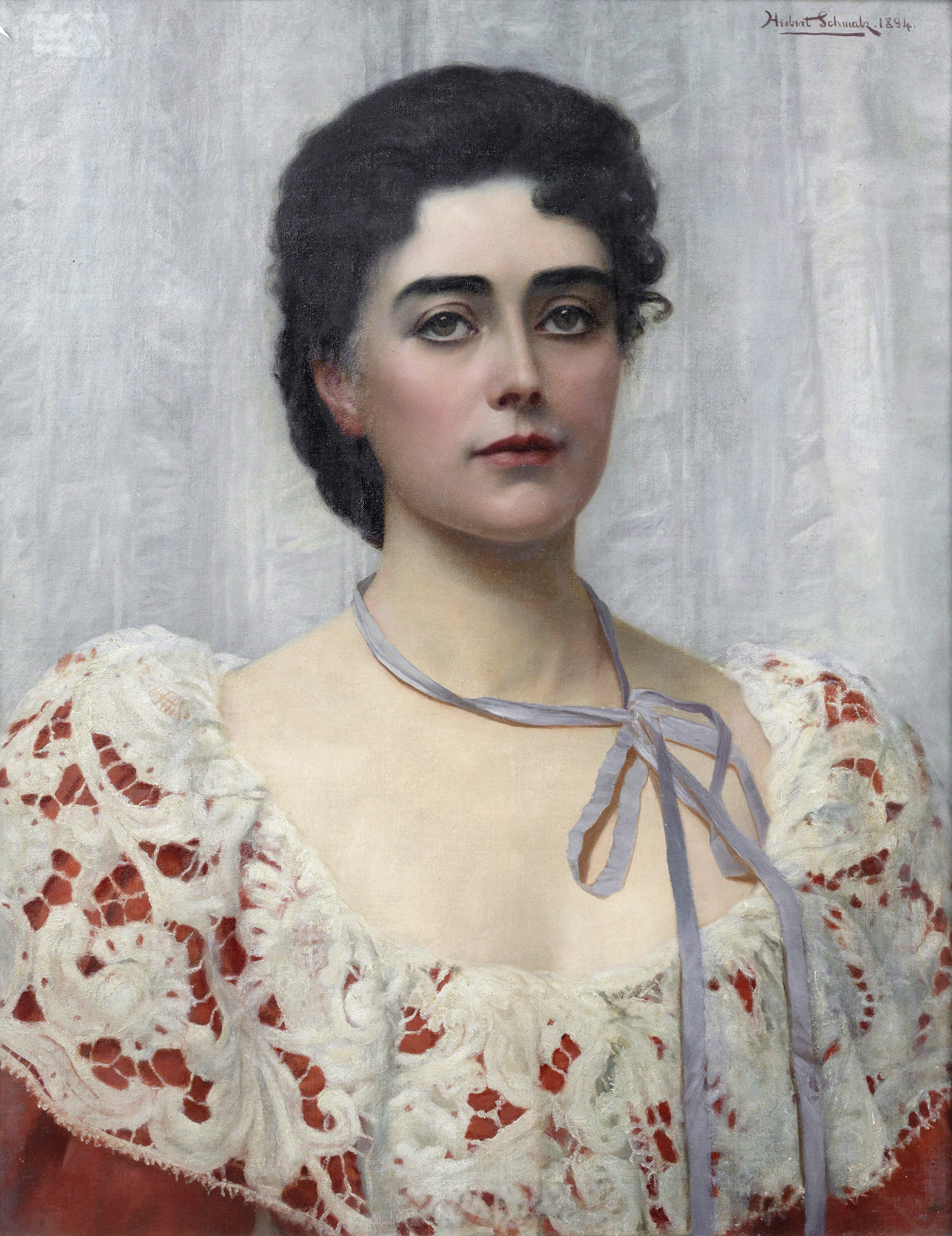
- Tweedie by Herbert Gustave Schmalz, 1894
- Born: Ethel Brilliana Harley; 1 January 1862; London, England
- Died: 15 April 1940 (aged 78); London, England
- Occupation: author
- Known for: travel books

Ethel Brilliana Tweedie FRGS (1862–1940) was a prolific English author, travel writer, biographer, historian, editor, journalist, photographer and illustrator. She wrote as Mrs Alec Tweedie, Mrs. Alec-Tweedie and as Ethel B. Harley.

== Early life ==
Ethel Tweedie was born 1 January 1862 in London, the daughter of George Harley F.R.S. (of Harley Street) and Emma Jessie (Muspratt) Harley, into an early life of wealth and privilege. Her siblings included a sister (Olga) and three brothers (Edward Vaughan Berkeley Harley, Vernon De V. and Harold S.), She was named by her father for a famous relative, Lady Brilliana Harley (wife of Sir Robert Harley of Brampton Bryan). She was educated at Queen's College, London, and abroad in Germany.

In 1886 she visited Iceland on holiday with her brother Vaughan B. Harley, her future husband Alexander (Alec) Leslie Tweedie, a woman friend, and one other man. At the suggestion of her father, she kept a journal of her travels and published it afterwards as her first book, A Girl's Ride in Iceland in 1895 (even including an appendix on Icelandic geysers by her father). She married Alexander Tweedie two years later on 1 January 1887.

In 1893, following a telegram warning of the sudden serious illness of her brother Vaughan in Christiania, Norway she and her sister travelled to see him. She returned to Norway again within two years, then later published her second book A Winter Jaunt to Norway: with Accounts of Nansen, Ibsen, Bjornson, Brandes, and Many Others outlining her travel experiences and meetings with a number of famous people while abroad. Then, tragically, her whole life changed in the early summer of 1896 with the sudden death of her husband. She never remarried.

In 1897, still upset and stunned by his death, she agreed to accompany her sister and a Finnish companion, Frau von Lilly, on a trip abroad to Finland. During that time she gathered material that eventually made its way into a third book, Through Finland in Carts , published later in 1898 and beginning her career as a popular writer.

== Author, photographer, painter, philanthropist ==
Writing, Mrs Alec Tweedie by Hoppé 1911

Tweedie's extensive bibliography spans the years from 1889 to 1936. Though she may be best known as a travel writer today, her works also include a biography of her father (George Harley, F.R.S. The Life of a London Physician), some works that are essentially a layperson's studies in early 20th century ethnography :Cremation the World Around and America As I Saw It; or, America Revisited. A great number of her short works were written and published in the London popular press. After 1912 her works became more autobiographical.

She was a photographer, a prolific painter and a watercolourist; her published works included her own sketches and paintings, many made during challenging and dangerous travels. Shortly after the Armistice of 11 November 1918 she began an extended tour of the Near East in November 1919 (described in her work Mainly East), returning in the spring of 1921. She visited a number of countries, including France, Spain, Greece, Italy, Turkey, Syria, Palestine, Egypt, India, and Southern Sudan in central Africa. Returning from that two-year journey she exhibited three hundred watercolour sketches in July 1921 in London at the Alpine Gallery on Conduit Street / Bond Street and continued with other exhibitions and one-woman shows over the following years, in both London and Paris. A year before her death in 1940 she presented over five hundred sketches to various foreign governments, institutions, the Navy League, the Royal Empire Society and the Royal Central Asian Society.

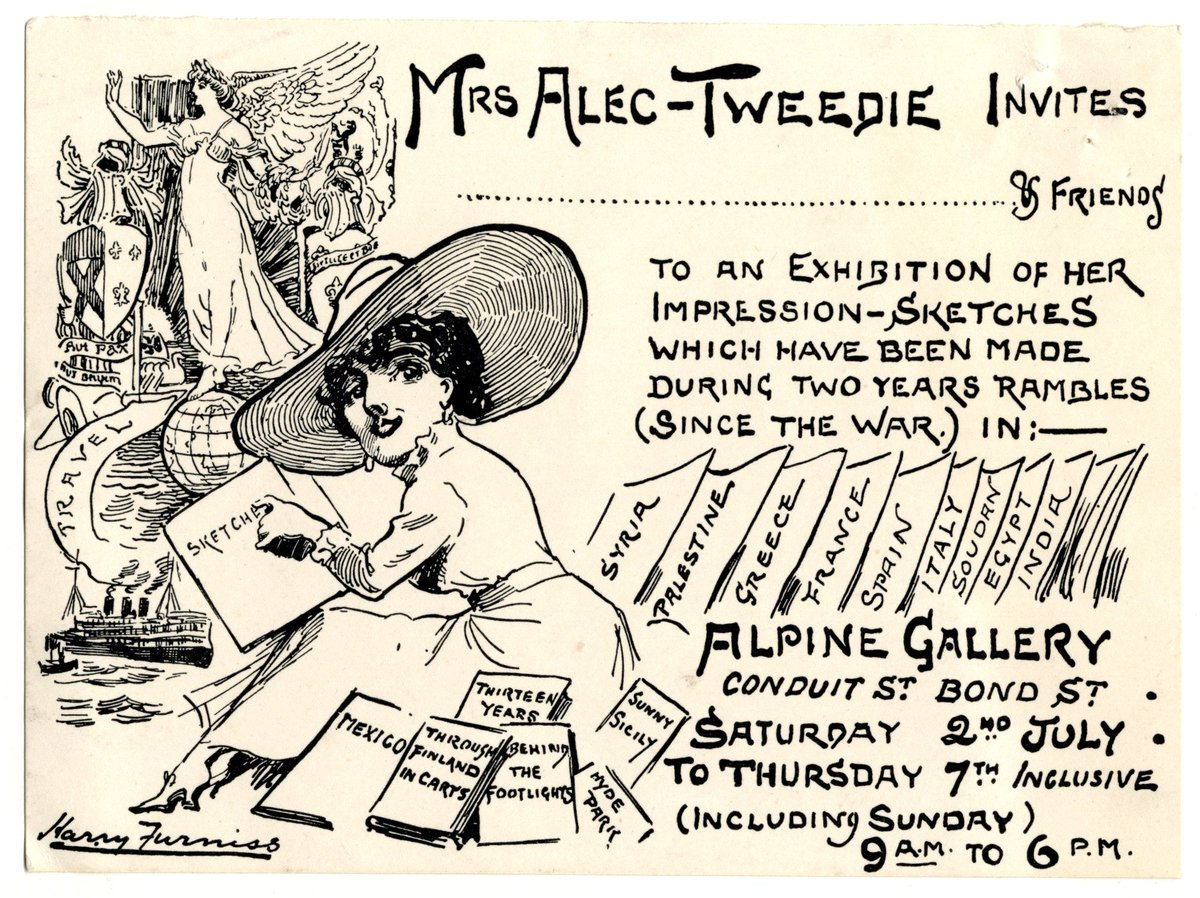
Announcement of exhibition at the Alpine Gallery

Tweedie was an early and enthusiastic advocate of women's rights and women's suffrage. She was astute and flexible in adapting the practical habits of others she met in her travels. When traveling in Iceland in 1886, rather than riding sidesaddle she quickly adapted the Icelandic women's habit of riding astride a horse or pony as a sensible necessity—radical behaviour for a British woman of her era. She wrote, "Necessity gives courage in emergencies. I determined therefore to throw aside conventionality, and do in 'Iceland as the Icelanders do.' ... Society is a hard task-master. Nothing is easier than to stick on a side-saddle, of course, and nothing more difficult than to ride gracefully. For comfort and safety, I say ride like a man."

Likely as a result of her own tragic situation, she felt strongly that families should provide early safeguards for both boy and girl children (an unusual sentiment for her times) for their education and upbringing. ("...It is a cruel thing to let a girl leave a home without a safeguard in proportion to the income of her family. It is a crueller thing to bring boys and girls into the world with insufficient provision for their education and maintenance... I feel strongly that every child born should have some kind of provision made for its education and maintenance and to give it a start in life. Both boys and girls should be treated exactly alike." )

During her life she served on many charitable committees of the International Council of Women (1899). She was a life governor of University College Hospital and St Mary's Hospital, London.

== Family life ==
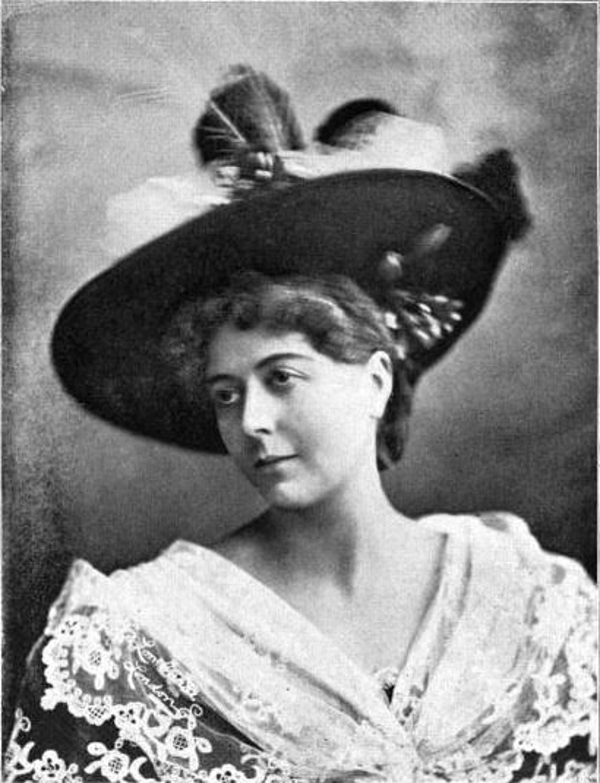
When First A Widow - Ethel Tweedie shortly after the death of her husband

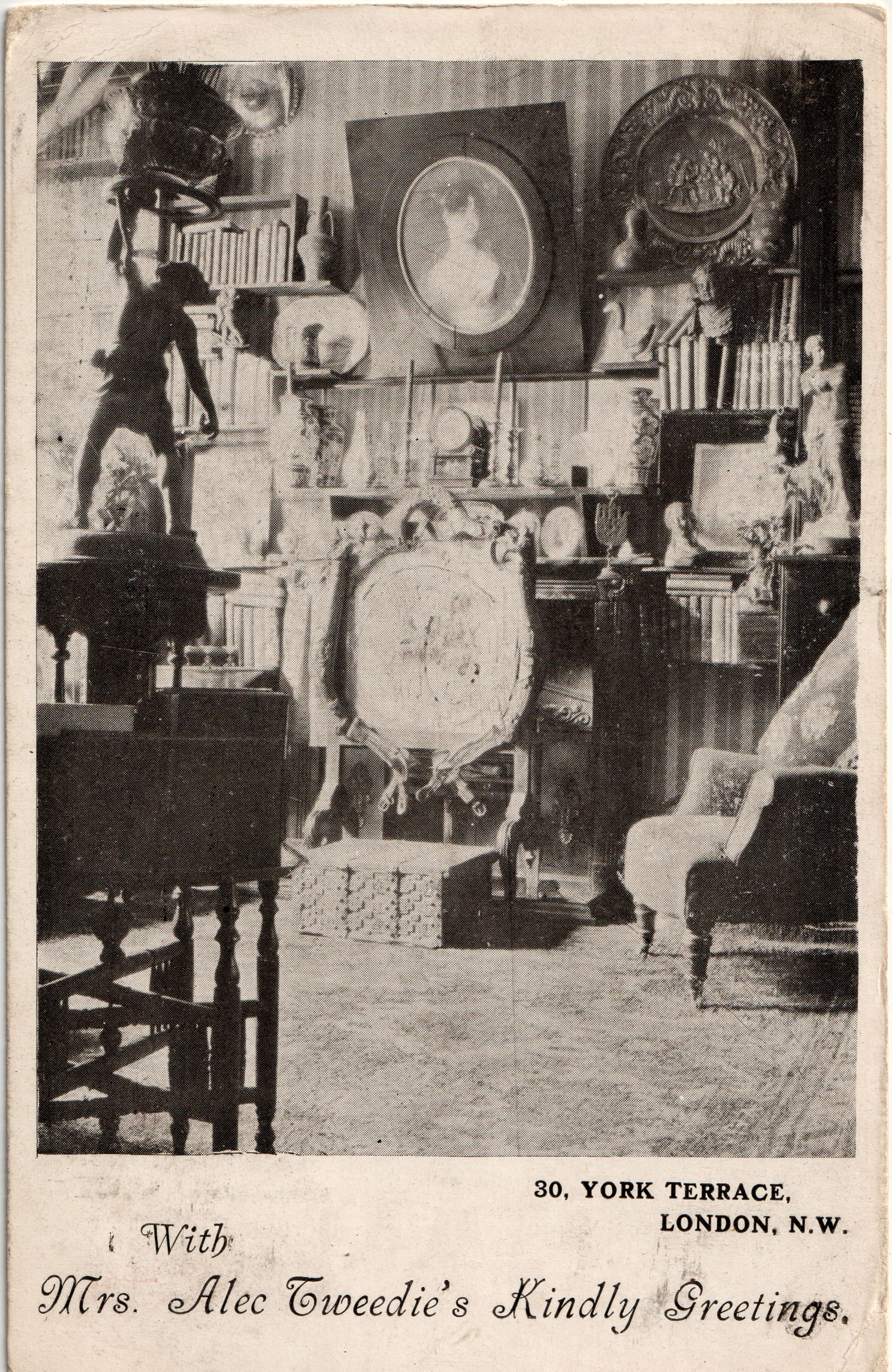
Home of Mrs Alec Tweedie, 30 York Terrance, London, NW

On 1 January 1887 she married Alexander Leslie Tweedie, a marine insurance broker born in India, and heir to a considerable fortune. They lived happily and well, in modest luxury, and had two sons, Harley Alexander Tweedie (6 May 1888 – 1926) and Leslie Kinloch Tweedie (11 January 1890 – 17 January 1916). Her husband died suddenly and unexpectedly at their home in Aldburgh, Suffolk nine years later, 25 May 1896, killed by the shock and responsibilities of financial disaster following the catastrophic failure of his marine insurance syndicate (caused by unforeseen British Admiralty court findings in the case of the ship the Benwell Tower which ruined both Alexander and his brother George Straton Tweedie, and a third partner Frederick Stumore). Her husband left her with no settlement. A few weeks later her father also died suddenly, leaving her nothing of his estate. She was left essentially destitute, with two young boys to raise. With no capital to draw on and no other means of income she turned to travel writing, relying on her writing skills and publishing contacts made during earlier, happier times.

She wrote for the popular press in London when possible. She wrote books based on her journeys, including detailed and fascinating portraits of celebrities she met abroad. She travelled widely and wrote of peoples in lands that were not usual British or European holiday destinations. She continued to write and publish even after her boys reached their majority and moved away. Her youngest son Second Lieutenant Leslie Kinloch Tweedie, Royal Field Artillery was later killed in the First World War. Her eldest son Squadron Leader Harley Alexander Tweedie and Flight Lieutenant Stanley Harry Wallage were killed when their Airco DH.9A crashed at Amman, Transjordan.

She settled into a life of international travel and reflection, and eventually became a very successful travel writer. When she was at home in her flat in Devonshire House, Mayfair, London, she hosted popular weekly receptions that brought together important people of her era and many international travellers. She continued an earlier tradition begun when she married: when she and her husband hosted luncheons or dinner parties, she encouraged guests to append an autograph, a sketch or a comment onto what evolved into a series of signature table-cloths. "Ethel ‘conceived the idea of coaxing the many delightful men and women of note who dined with us to pencil their signatures upon the table slips.’ She then embroidered over the signatures, doodles and sketches, with brilliant red thread.". She eventually published a journal describing many of those receptions, including a compendium of photographs of the signature table-cloths, as My Table Cloths; A Few Reminiscences.

In addition to sketching and painting, her wide range of interests included embroidery and textiles: she even bequeathed to the Victoria and Albert Museum in February 1927 some fine examples of English silks, laces and needlework acquired in her travels.

She resided in her flat in Devonshire House, London, and continued to write and publish until only a few years before her death in London, 15 April 1940, aged 78. Following her death, several other items including two icons were bequeathed in 1940 to the Victoria and Albert Museum by her estate.

== Related Information ==
- The Tweedie Archive -- This website once hosted much detailed information on Tweedie (Tweedy) genealogy. Unfortunately that website is no longer functioning but much of the information is still available via the web archive "Way Back Machine" (see next entry).
- The Wayback Machine -- The website is a partial recreation of the original 'Tweedie Archive' site. See especially this dated list of main events in Ethel's life. It cites many lesser publications from the popular press, including quite a few from The Times.
- Hanson Auctioneers -- The website includes an undated photograph of Mrs. Tweedie in later years, as well as information on an estate sale of her possessions. Recent changes to the website have removed an earlier photograph and background information on Mrs. Tweedie, but much of the information is still available via the web archive "Way Back Machine".
- NORA (the Nordic Journal of Feminist and Gender Research) [Vol. 17, No. 4, 273-288, December 2009] -- The organization published an interesting study of her travels in the North in "Europe's Northern Periphery and the Future of Women in the Travel Narratives of Ethel Tweedie".
- Guess who’s coming to dinner? Ethel Tweedie’s celebrity table-cloths —A very interesting side note on the practice of "signature table-cloths" and some of the properties that Ethel bequeathed to New Zealand.

== Bibliography ==
=== Novels and longer works ===
- A Girl's Ride In Iceland (1889)
- The Oberammergau Passion Play (1890)
- A Winter Jaunt To Norway: with Accounts of Nansen, Ibsen, Bjornson, Brandes, and Many Others (1894)
- Wilton, Q.C.; Or, Life in a Highland Shooting-Box (1895)
- Danish versus English Butter-Making (1895)
- Through Finland In Carts (1898)
- The First College Open To Women: Queens College, London: Memories and Records of Work Done, 1848–1898 (1898)
- George Harley, F.R.S.; or, The Life of a London Physician (1899)
- Mexico As I Saw It (1901)
- Behind The Footlights (1904)
- Sunny Sicily: Its Rustics and Its Ruins (1904)
- Porfirio Diaz: Seven Times President of Mexico (1906)
- The Maker Of Modern Mexico Porfirio Diaz (1906)
- Hyde Park: Its History And Romance (1908)
- Thirteen Years of a Busy Woman's Life (1912)
- America As I Saw It; Or, America Revisited (1913)
- Busy Days: A Birthday Book (1913)
- Women the World Over: A Sketch Both Light and Gay, Perchance Both Dull and Stupid (1914)
- My Table-Cloths; A Few Reminiscences (1916)
- Mexico: From Diaz To The Kaiser (1917)
- Women And Soldiers (1918)
- A Woman On Four Battle-Fronts (1919)
- Mainly East (In Prose – Perhaps Prosey) (1922)
- An Adventurous Journey: Russia -- Siberia -- China (1926)
- Me and Mine: A Medley Of Thoughts And Memories (1932)
- Cremation the World Around (1932)
- Manchuria, Japan and China: water colour drawings by Mrs. Alec-Tweedie (1932)
- Tight Corners of My Adventurous Life (1933)
- My Legacy Cruise (the Peak Year of My Life) (1936)
- The Preface to Prescott's History of Mexico (?)
- A Chat With Dr. Nansen (?)

=== Essays and shorter works ===
- Women and War Economy (April 1916, The English Review Volume XXII No 4)
