= Compound spirit of ether =

Chemical solution used for pain relief

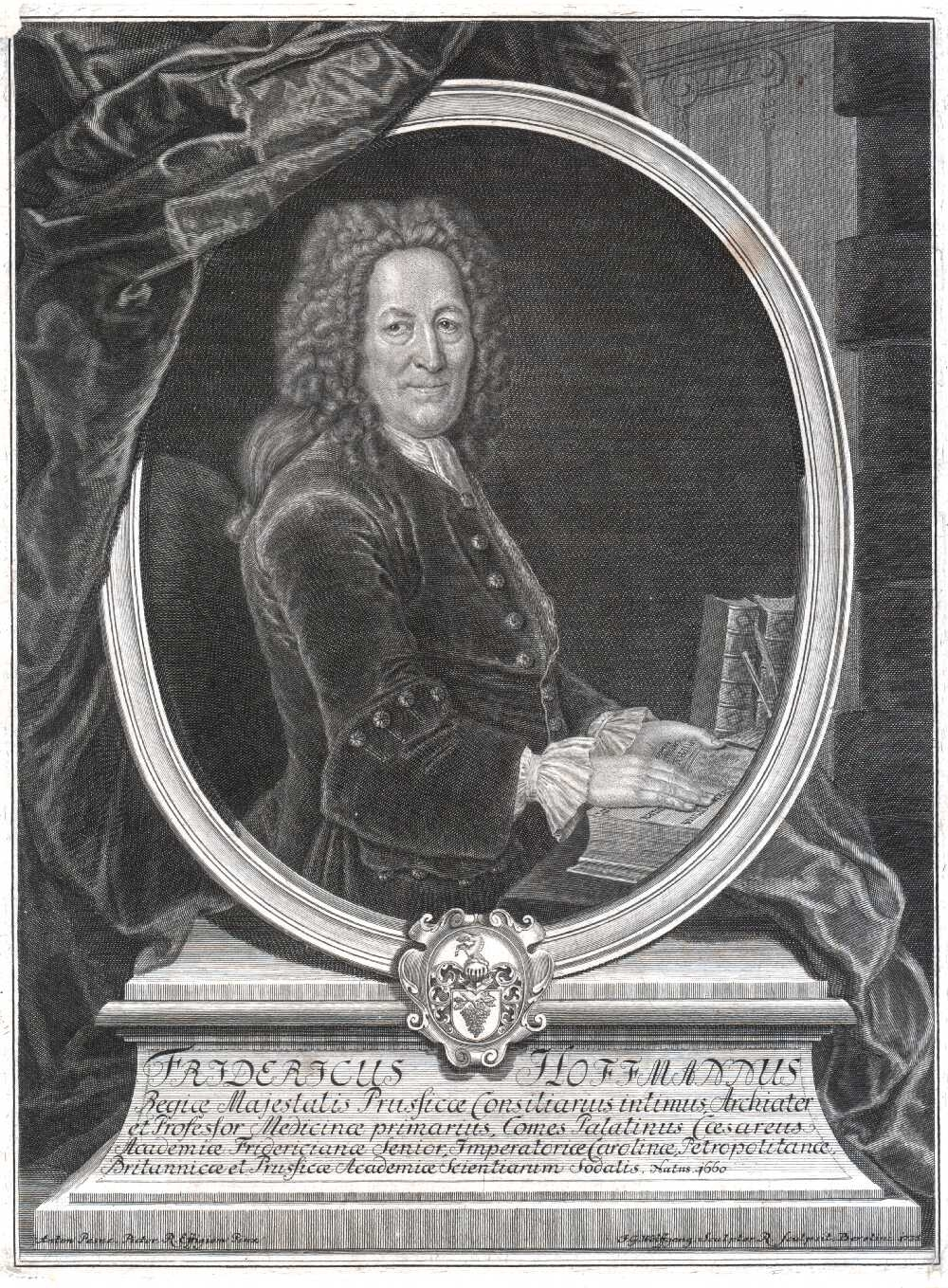
Friedrich Hoffmann (1660–1742), was a German physician.

Compound spirit of ether, also called Hoffmann's anodyne, Hoffmann's drops, or aetheris spiritus compositus, is a solution of one part diethyl ether in three parts alcohol. It was used traditionally as an anodyne or as a hypnotic. Its use as a drug was introduced by Friedrich Hoffmann.
