= John Alfred Codrington =

British Army officer (1898-1991)

- Born: 28 October 1898; London, England
- Died: 25 April 1991 (aged 92); London, England
- Education: Harrow School; Christ Church, Oxford; Strasbourg University
- Spouse: Primrose Harley (m. 1936; div. 1942)
- Father: Alfred Codrington
- Relatives: William Melville Codrington (brother)
- Military career
- Allegiance: United Kingdom
- Branch: British Army
- Service years: 1915-1920
- Rank: Lieutenant colonel
- Units: Coldstream Guards
- Conflicts: World War I; Western Front
- Awards: Veitch Memorial Medal

Lt Col John Alfred Codrington (28 October 1898 – 25 April 1991) was a career British Army officer with a life-long interest in plants and flowers.

He was born in London, the son of Lieutenant General Sir Alfred Codrington (1854–1945) and Adela Harriet née Portal (1859–1935).

As a boy aged 6–7 he painted four sets of flowers, nineteen paintings in all. The interest never left him and, while serving, he would write long letters to Wild Flower Magazine.

Educated at Harrow, Christ Church, Oxford and Strasbourg University; he served with the French Red Cross in France, 1915–16; then attended Royal Military College, Sandhurst in 1916–17; and was commissioned into the Coldstream Guards, his father's regiment, in 1917. He served on the Western Front with 3 Bn, Coldstream Guards, 1917–18;and was on garrison duty in Cologne, Germany, 1918–19. In 1920 he was appointed Aide de Camp to Lt Gen Sir Tom Bridges in Smyrna, Turkey, 1920. He served in Turkey, in Syria as British Liaison Officer to French forces; was attached to French Army and the French Foreign Legion; served in the Sudan and Egypt; was Aide de Camp to FM Sir Philip Walhouse Chetwode, Commander-in-Chief of the Army in India, from 1933 to 1935; retired in 1937 until 1939 when he was attached to the Foreign Office; Assistant Chief of Staff, Gibraltar, 1942–43; Special Liaison Officer, Algiers, 1943–44; Honorary Lt Col in 1948.

In 1936 he married Primrose Harley with a shared interest in gardens and in painting; they divorced in 1942.

In the 1950s and '60s he wrote a set of 'botanical maps and directions' for over 300 scarce and rare plants in England and Scotland.

In 1989, he was awarded the Royal Horticultural Society Veitch Memorial Medal in gold.

He died at his London home in 1991.
