= Goldbeater's skin =

Processed outer membrane of the intestine of an animal

Goldbeater's skin is the processed outer membrane of the intestine of an animal, typically cattle, which is valued for its strength against tearing. The term derives from its traditional use as durable layers interleaved between sheets of gold stock during the process of making gold leaf by goldbeating, as a batch process producing many "leaves" at the same time. In the early modern production of airships, application of its high strength-to-weight ratio and reliability were crucial for building at least the largest examples.

== Manufacture ==
To manufacture goldbeater's skin, the gut of oxen (or other cattle) is soaked in a dilute solution of potassium hydroxide, washed, stretched, beaten flat and thin, and treated chemically to prevent putrefaction. A pack of 1,000 pieces of goldbeater's skin requires the gut of about 400 oxen and is 1 inch (25 mm) thick.

Up to 120 sheets of gold laminated with goldbeater's skin can be beaten at the same time, since the skin is thin and elastic and does not tear under heavy goldbeating. The resultant thickness of gold leaf can be as small as 1 μm-thick.

== Applications ==
- Goldbeater's skin is used as the sensitive element in hygrometers, since its hygroscopic behavior includes contraction or expansion in response to atmospheric humidity.
- During the invention of the telephone, Alexander Graham Bell used a drum of goldbeater's skin with an armature of magnetised iron attached to its middle as a sound receiver.
- In 1754, Vatican priest Antonio Piaggio used goldbeater's skin in one of the earliest attempts to unscroll and read the Herculaneum papyri, ancient Greek texts buried and hardened into carbonized lumps by the 79 AD eruption of Mount Vesuvius.
- The North German Confederation printed 10- and 30-groschen postage stamps on goldbeater's skin to prevent reuse of these high-value stamps.
- Joseph Thomas Clover invented an apparatus for measuring the inhalation of chloroform in 1862; it included a large reservoir bag, lined with goldbeater's skin to make it airtight, into which a known volume of liquid chloroform was injected, while its contraction or expansion was monitored.
- Due to its transparency, strength, and fairly uniform thickness, goldbeater's skin is used to repair holes and tears in manuscripts written on vellum.
- Goldbeater's skin (sometimes also called "fish skin" in this context) is sometimes used to seal oboe reeds to prevent them from leaking air. Likewise, the pads in western concert flutes are sometimes covered with a thin fish skin membrane for this purpose.
- The goldbeater's skin test is used to assess the tanning properties of a compound.
- In the eighteenth and nineteenth centuries, goldbeater's skin was used as a material for condoms.

=== Airships ===
Large quantities of goldbeater's skin were used to make the gas bags of early balloons created by the Corps of Royal Engineers at Chatham, Kent, starting in 1881–82 and culminating in 1883 with The Heron, of 10,000 cu ft (280 m^{3}) capacity. The method of preparing and making gas-tight joins in the skins was known only to a family called Weinling, from the Alsatia London area, who were employed by the Royal Engineers for many years. The British had a monopoly on the technique until around 1912, when the Germans adopted the material for the internal gas bags of the "zeppelin" rigid airships, exhausting the available supply: about 200,000 sheets were used for a typical World War I zeppelin, while the USS Shenandoah (ZR-1) needed 750,000 sheets. The sheets were joined together and folded into impermeable layers.

== See also ==
- Vark
