= Carl Ludwig Schleich =

German surgeon and writer (1859–1922)

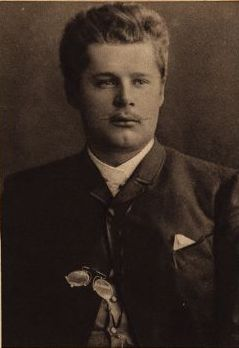
- Born: 19 July 1859; Stettin, Pomerania.
- Died: 7 March 1922 (aged 62); Bad Saarow
- Occupations: physician, philosopher, writer, musician, painter
- Known for: introducing local anaesthesia into clinical practice

Carl Ludwig Schleich (19 July 1859 – 7 March 1922) was a German surgeon and writer. He is best known for his contribution to clinical anesthesia. In addition, he was also a philosopher, poet and painter.

== Biography ==
=== Family ===
Schelich's ancestors were a Munich family of prominent painters who had moved to Freienwalde. They included Robert Schleich and Eduard Schleich the Elder.

=== Early life ===
From a very early age, Schleich was exposed to a background in biology. His father was very interested in natural history and the leading theories in the epoch. Later Schleich would recall:

In the year 1864, Graefe was a guest in my father's house during the historic conference of biologists, at which Darwin, Haeckel, and Virchow were the mutually hostile protagonists. I, alas, who was only five years of age, was not even aware of this earth-shaking event, since I was lying unconscious in the grip of meningitis.

In his childhood, he frequently heard "extremely vigorous" debates about the existence of God, since his father was an unbeliever and his uncle, Hermann Frederick, a pastor. These conversations caused a deep impression of Schleich, who later wrote:

It is strange to note how deeply many of the arguments for and against the existence of God and immortality impressed themselves on my young mind... Such arguments would occupy me for days, and I recalled them during our divinity lessons, and even to this day they have their repercussions in my philosophical reflections.

Following this period, Schleich was confirmed and wanted to become a pastor.

=== Career ===
Later, however, Schleich decided to study medicine in Zurich, Greifswald and Berlin, where he was an assistant to the prominent anthropologist Rudolf Virchow. In 1887, Schleich received his doctorate at the University of Greifswald, and stayed there as an assistant two years more; a period of time where Virchow spoke to him about his antidarwinist views.

Afterwards, he opened a private practice in Berlin, and in 1899 attained a professorship at the University of Berlin. In the early 1890s, Schleich introduced a methodology of infiltration anesthesia by using a highly diluted cocaine solution.

In 1900, he became director of the Department of Surgery at Gross-Lichterfelde.He would become a pioneer of glial research, and recognized that glial cells played a dynamic role in nervous system function. Schleich believed that an interconnected and interactive neuronal-glial network was a substrate for brain functions.

Among his written works was an influential treatise on hysteria research called Gedankenmacht und Hysterie. Schleich was also an accomplished poet and novelist. One of his better known fictional works was the popular Phantasien über den Sinn des Lebens, which translates to "Fantasy about the Meaning of Life". His memoirs Besonnte Vergangenheit (1922) became one of the most successful autobiographies in the German language, running well above 1 million copies. The book laid the commercial foundations of the German editor Ernst Rowohlt, and was translated into English with the title "Those Were Good Days".

== Views on science and religion ==
In his essays Von der Seele, Schleich wrote about what he perceived as "epistemological monopolies", or leading scientific opinions that he described as "just as dogmatic as the Church." He, for instance, said that "the Darwinian theory has preached enough about the survival instinct as an almost dogmatic cause for the evolution of living beings;" and he concluded:

It is no longer an indisputable fact that natural science can be just as dogmatic as the Church. The stubborn adherence to prejudices, traditions and comfortable habits is but a general human obstacle to progress, no matter whether it is expressed at Church, the State, or the laboratory. We have these pretentions of infallibility here and there, and the popes of science have been no less intolerant than those of the Church, and still are.

He maintained that "Darwinism by no means overturns the concept of creation", and, in his Memoirs (1920), he expressed a strong belief in the existence of God and the relation of this to science, stating that this was one of the main objects of his physiological studies:

It has always been my endeavour to compare the intellectual processes with the action of an electrical apparatus of marvellous precision. But I have never denied that this is only one, and perhaps the most interesting mode of considering the most sacred miracle of the soul; and not an unveiling, by a theory of cognition, of its metaphysical home and its God-given function...
What I most passionately desire is to turn men away from the barren desert of materialism, and compel them to recognize the governance of quite other powers than capital, politics, the struggle for existence, and the laws of inheritance. In my own way I have become a believer, through my work at the microscope and the contemplation of Nature, and I am eager to do what I can to contribute to the union of science and religion. He who knows much of Nature, and knows it thoroughly, must come to believe in a metaphysical Ruler. The miracles are too many, and one of the noblest tasks of science is to show that the most everyday things, the most apparently familiar, the simplest processes, contain a chain of amazing revelations and mysteries.

For holding these views, Scheliech was criticized during his lifetime as "an enemy of science;" but he refused to deny his conviction that there were mystic "mysteries" beyond the realm of science:

A critic once called me an enemy of science. Well I have become an enemy of the science that with narrow-minded dogmatism merely makes war upon all that lies beyond the hedge of its methodical self-circumscribed garden, which yields only those vegetables that feed the gardener, but refuses to know anything of all the possibilities of the free and lovely virgin forest wherein one may indeed lose one's way.

== Works ==
- Das Ich und die Dämonien.
- Schmerzlose Operationen. Örtliche Betäubung mit indifferenten Flüssigkeiten. (Painless operations. Local anesthesia with indifferent liquids.) – 1894
- Von der Seele. Essays. (From the soul, essays) – 1910
  - See Von der Seele. Essays – 1922
- Erinnerungen an Strindberg (Memories of Strindberg) – 1917
- Vom Schaltwerk der Gedanken. Neue Einsichten und Betrachtungen über die Seele. (Of the switching mechanism of thought. New insights and reflections on the soul)- 1916
- Gedankenmacht und Hysterie (Thought power and hysteria) – 1920
- Die Weisheit der Freude. Und andere ausgewählte Schriften (The wisdom of joy. And other selected writings) -1920
- Das Problem des Todes. (The problem of death) 1920
- Das Ich und die Dämonien (The ego and the demons) – 1920
- Bewußtsein und Unsterblichkeit (Consciousness and immortality) – 1920
- "Besonnte Vergangenheit. Lebenserinnerungen eines Arztes". spiegel.de. 1920. Archived from the original on 8 September 2011. (Sunlit past. Memoirs of a physician)
- Die Wunder der Seele. (Miracles of the Soul); with a foreword by Carl Gustav Jung- 1934

== Bibliography ==
- Parts of this article are based on a translation of an article from the German Wikipedia.
- Glial cells: The other cells of the nervous system
- NCBI History of anesthesia in Germany
- Schleich, Carl Ludwig (1936). Those were good days. Norton
- Schleich, Carl Ludwig (2013). Besonnte Vergangenheit: Lebenserinnerungen 1859–1919: Aus Fraktur übertragen. Severus Verlag. ISBN 9783863475093
