= George Harley (physician) =

Scottish physician (1829–1896)

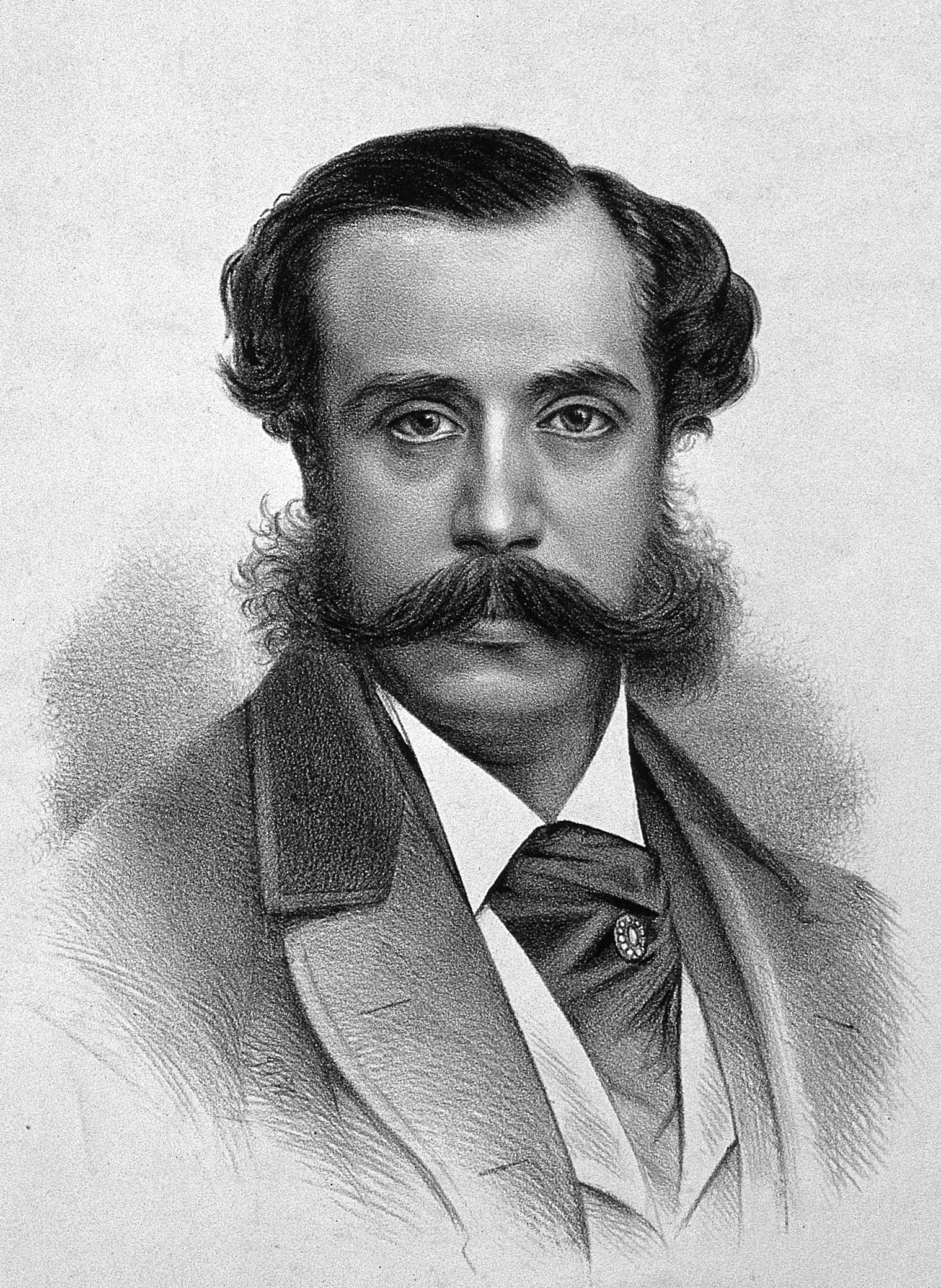
George Harley, 1873 lithograph

George Harley (12 February 1829 – 27 October 1896) was a Scottish physician.

== Life ==
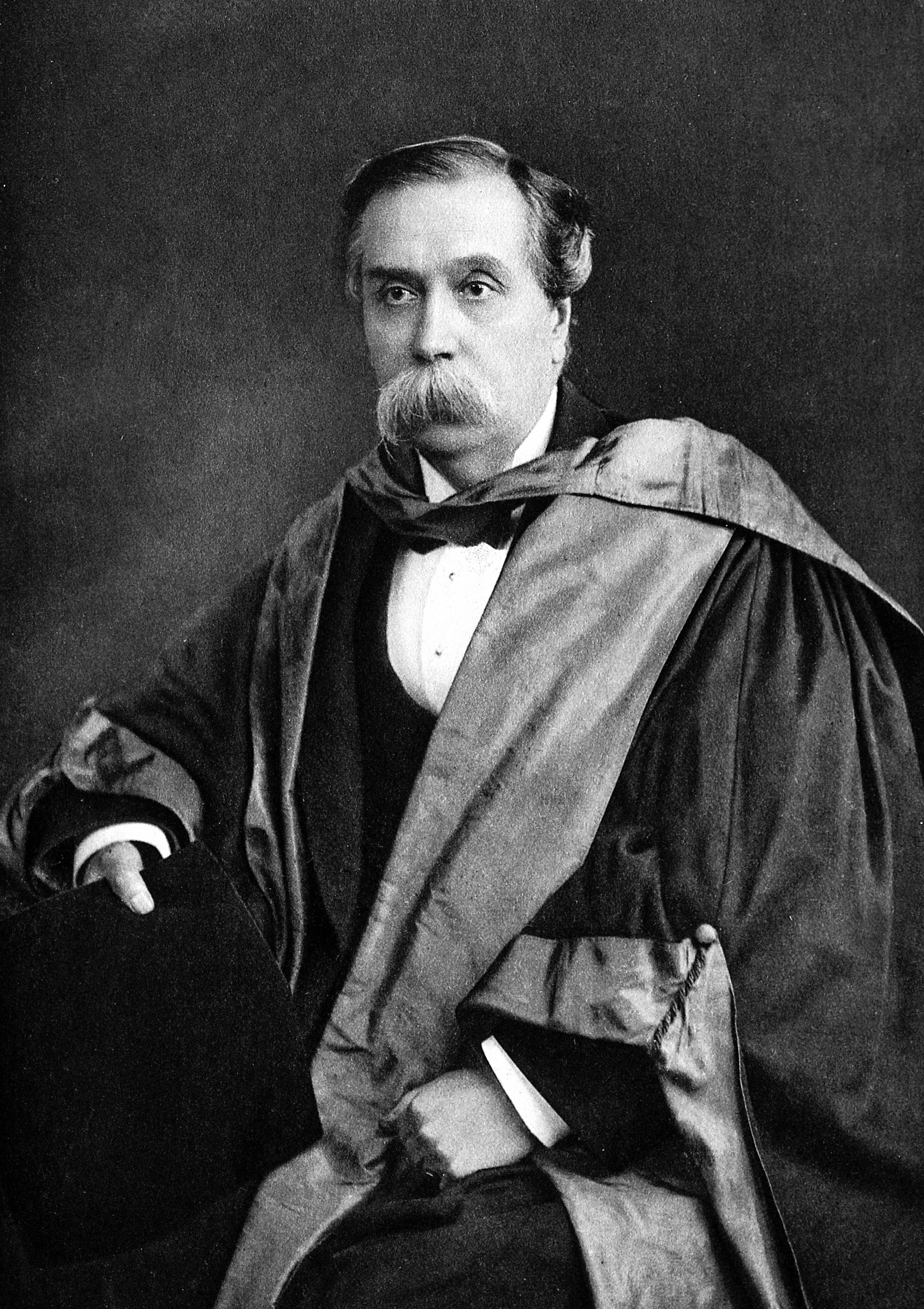
George Harley

The only son of George Barclay Harley and Margaret Macbeath, he was born at Harley House, Haddington, in East Lothian, on 12 February 1829. His father was 63 at the time of his birth, and died soon afterwards; and he was brought up by his mother and maternal grandmother. He received his early education at the Haddington burgh schools, and at the Hill Street Institution, Edinburgh. He then went to the University of Edinburgh, where he matriculated at the age of 17, and graduated M.D. in August 1850.

After acting for fifteen months as house surgeon and resident physician to the Edinburgh Royal Infirmary, Harley spent two years in Paris, working in the physiological and chemical laboratories of Charles Dollfus, François Verdeil, and Charles Adolph Wurtz. He next worked in the physiological laboratory of the College de France, at first under François Magendie and then under Claude Bernard, whose publications on the influence of the liver in the production of diabetes led Harley to undertake further work. During his two years' residence in Paris he was preoccupied with physiological researches, and in 1853 he was elected annual president of the Parisian Medical Society.

Harley then spent two years in Germany at the universities of Würzburg (under Rudolf Virchow), Giessen (under Justus Liebig), Berlin, Vienna, and Heidelberg. When he was studying in Vienna, during the height of the Crimean War, he attempted to join the army of Omar Pasha as a civil surgeon, but passport issues meant he was arrested instead.

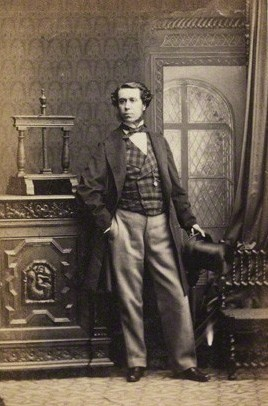
George Harley, 1863, by Camille Silvy

In 1855 Harley was appointed lecturer on practical physiology and histology at University College London; and was also made curator of its anatomical museum. In 1856 he started private practice in Nottingham Place. In 1858 he was elected a fellow of the Chemical Society, and fellow of the College of Physicians of Edinburgh. In 1859 he became professor of medical jurisprudence at University College in the place of William Benjamin Carpenter, and in 1860 physician to the hospital. These appointments he held till eye trouble obliged him to resign them. He was elected a Fellow of the Royal Society in 1865, at the age of 36. In 1864 he was elected fellow of the Royal College of Physicians of London; he afterwards held the post of examiner in anatomy and physiology in the college. He also became corresponding member of numerous foreign scientific societies. He assisted in founding the British Institute of Preventive Medicine.

Harley died suddenly from rupture of a coronary artery and haemorrhage into the pericardium on 27 October 1896 at his house, 77 (now 25) Harley Street. His body was cremated at Woking on 30 October, and the remains buried at Kingsbury Old Church on the same day.

== Works ==
Harley made observations while in Paris, which were recorded in the Chimie Anatomique of Charles Philippe Robin and François Verdeil. Among these were the recognition of iron as a constituent of urine, and the observation that the colour of normal human urine was due to urobilin. While at Heidelberg Harley studied in Robert Bunsen's laboratory the methods of gas analysis. After his return to England he made researches on the chemistry of respiration. Some of the results were published in the Philosophical Transactions. He read at the Leeds meeting of the British Association in 1858 a paper in which he showed that pancreatin was capable of digesting both starchy and albuminous substances. In 1862 he received the triennial prize of the Royal College of Surgeons of England for his researches into the anatomy and physiology of the suprarenal bodies.

In 1864 Harley participated in the committee of the Royal Medical and Chirurgical Society appointed to study the subject of suspended animation by drowning, hanging, and other causes. The experiments were carried out in his laboratory at University College, as were those for the Society's Chloroform Committee (1864), of which Harley was also a member.

In toxicology, Harley made researches into the action of strychnine, and on Calabar bean; and in 1864 read a paper to the British Association poisoned arrows. He demonstrated that strychnia and wourali have the property of reciprocally neutralising the toxic effects of one another.

Harley's major publications treated of the diseases of the liver. Expanding from his thesis M.D. “Oleum jecoris aselli” submitted to the University of Edinburgh in 1850, in 1863 he published Jaundice, its Pathology and Treatment; this he eventually replaced in 1883 by his book on Diseases of the Liver,; it was reprinted in Canada and in America, and was translated into German by Dr. J. Kraus of Carlsbad. In 1885 he published a pamphlet on Sounding for Gall Stones, and in the following year a work on Inflammation of the Liver, in which he advocated puncture of the capsule in congestive liver induration, and 'hepatic phlebotomy' for acute hepatitis. In 1868 his old pupil, George T. Brown, brought out a book on Histology, of demonstrations which Harley had given at University College. The second edition of the book Dr. Harley edited himself.

During a long period of rest in dark rooms, after a breakdown of his eyesight, Harley dictated to an amanuensis The Urine and its Derangements (1872); this work was reprinted in America and translated into French and Italian. In 1859 he became editor of a new year-book on medicine and surgery, brought out by the New Sydenham Society, and worked for it for some years.

Harley contributed to medical journals. He invented a microscope which by a simple adjustment could be transformed from a monocular into a binocular or into a polarising instrument, either of a high or a low power. He wanted to reform English orthography, and published a book entitled The Simplification of English Spelling (1877), in which he advocated the omission of unneeded duplicated consonants from all words, except personal names.

== Family ==
Harley married Emma Jessie, daughter of James Muspratt of Seaforth Hall, near Liverpool. She survived him with three children: Vaughan Harley, M.D. (1863–1923); Ethel Brilliana Tweedie (Mrs. Alec Tweedie), the author; and Olga Harley.

== Notes ==
Attribution

This article incorporates text from a publication now in the public domain: Lee, Sidney, ed. (1901). "Harley, George". Dictionary of National Biography (1st supplement). Vol. 2. London: Smith, Elder & Co.
