= Joseph Thomas Clover =

English doctor and pioneer of anaesthesia (1825–1882)

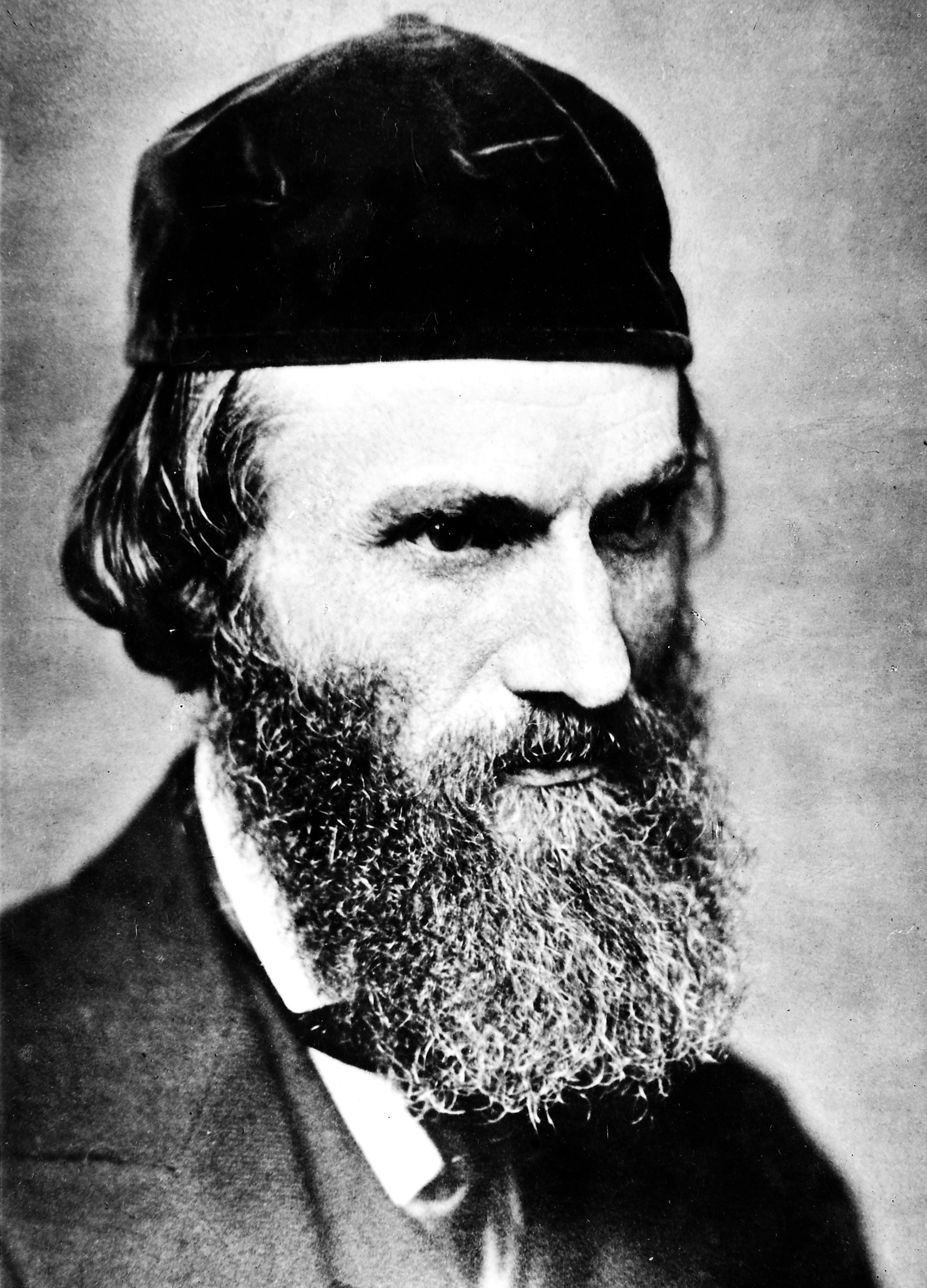
- Born: 28 February 1825; Aylsham, Norfolk, England
- Died: 27 September 1882 (aged 57); 3 Cavendish Place, London, England
- Occupations: Physician, anaesthetist
- Children: 4

Joseph Thomas Clover (born 28 February 1825; baptised 7 May 1825 – 27 September 1882) was an English medical doctor and innovator of anaesthesia. He invented a variety of pieces of apparatus to deliver anaesthetics, including ether and chloroform, safely and controllably. By 1871, he had administered anaesthetics 13,000 times without a fatality.

Clover assisted at surgery of public figures including Napoleon III, Princess Alexandra of Denmark and her husband King Edward VII (then Prince of Wales), Sir Robert Peel, and Florence Nightingale.

His inventions included the bulky 'Clover's chloroform apparatus' (1862), with which he was often photographed; and the compact 'Clover's portable regulating ether inhaler' (1877), which remained in use well into the 20th century.

With fellow innovator John Snow, Clover is one of the supporters on the crest of the Royal College of Anaesthetists.

== Early life ==
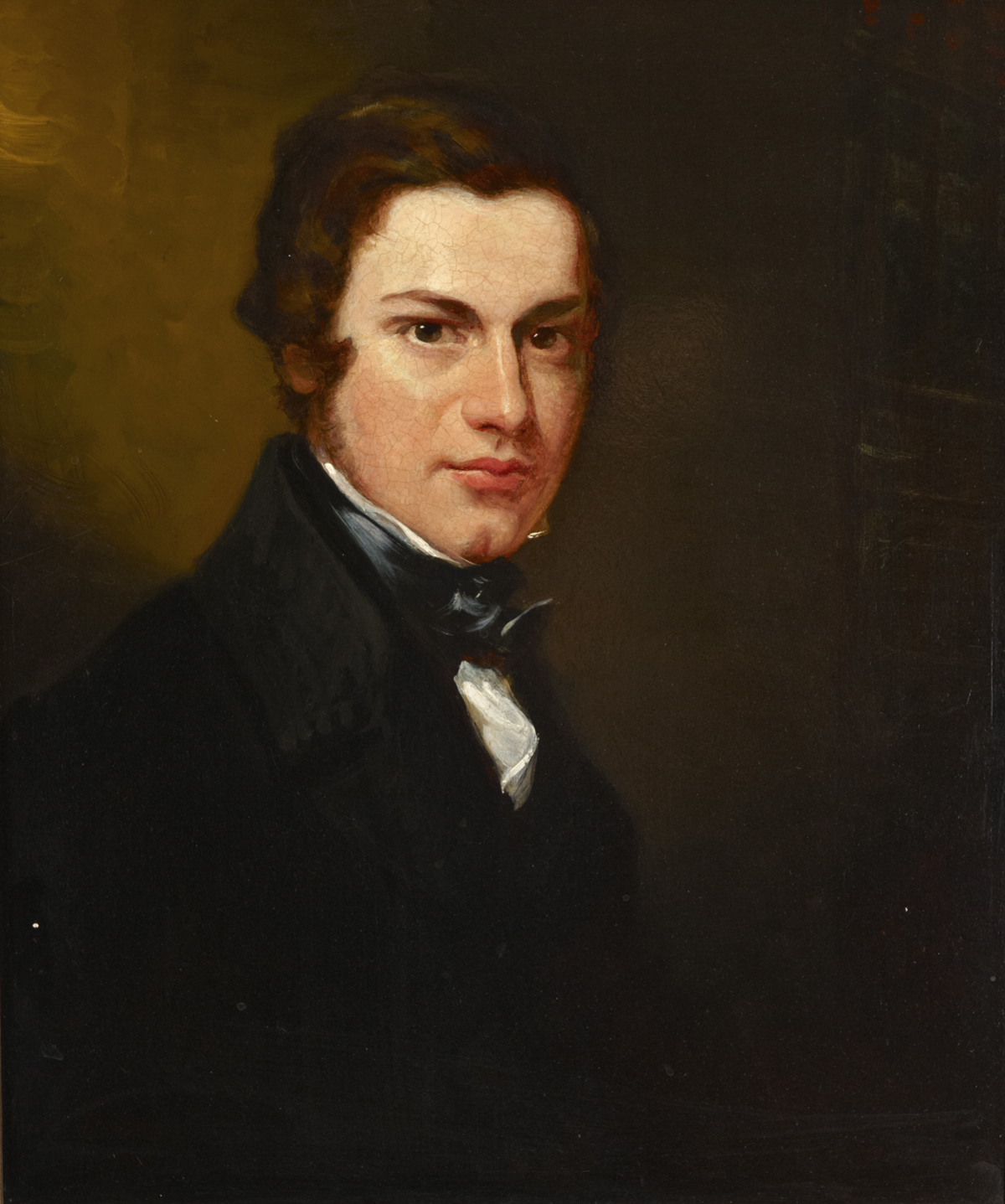
Portrait of Clover as a young man, painted by his uncle.

Clover was born in the town of Aylsham, Norfolk to John Wright Clover, a draper and shopkeeper, and Elizabeth Mary Ann Clover (née Peterson) John Wright Clover's second wife (married at Aylsham on 11 June 1821). He was educated at the Gray Friars' Priory School, Norwich. When he was 16, Clover was apprenticed as a surgical dresser to Charles Gibson, a local surgeon.

Clover enrolled to study medicine at University College Hospital in 1844, where Joseph Lister (innovator of antisepsis) was a fellow student.

== Career ==
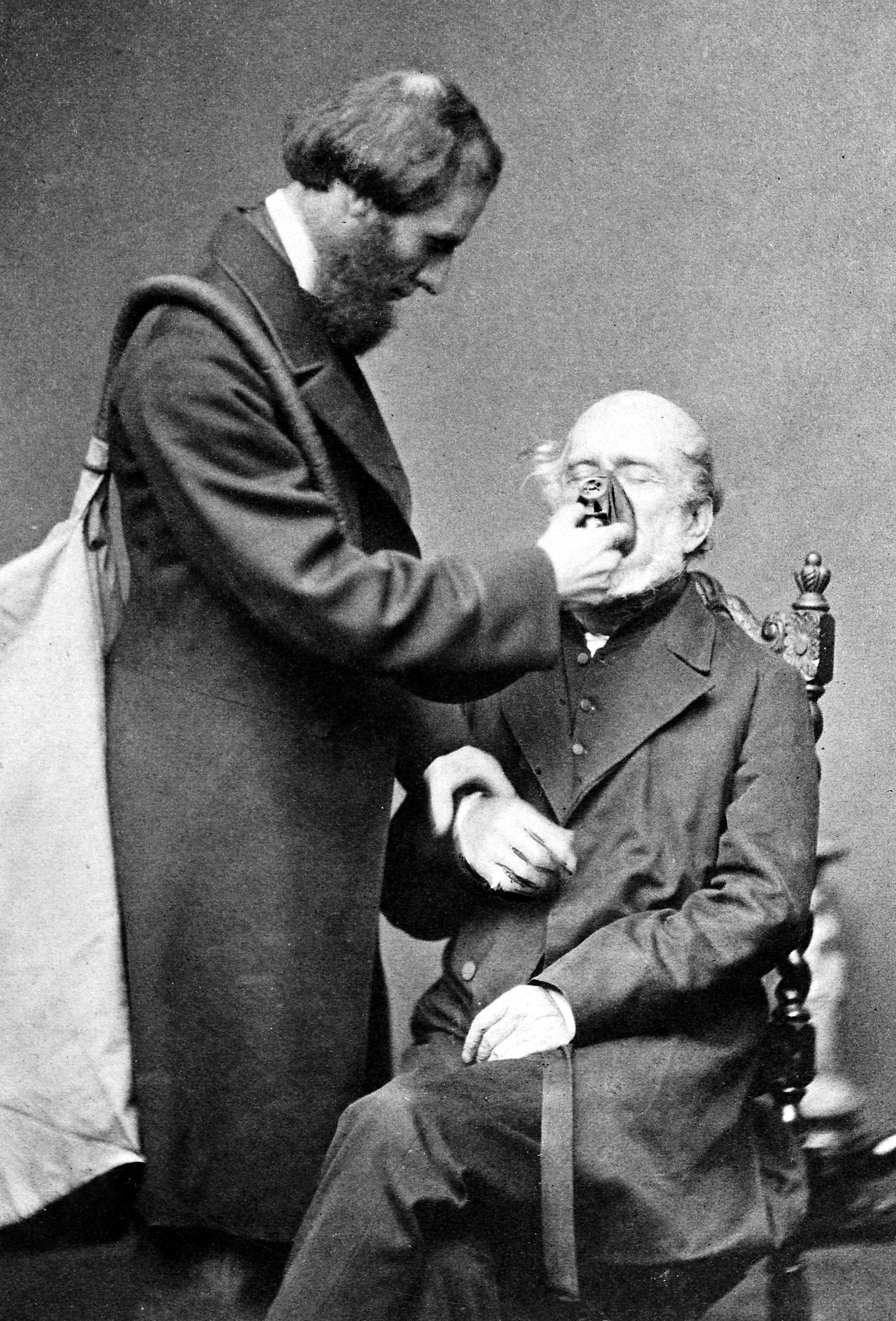
Posed photograph of Joseph Clover demonstrating his chloroform apparatus on his father, John Wright Clover, in 1862

Clover became house surgeon to James Syme upon graduation in 1846. He became Resident Medical Officer at University College Hospital in 1848, and was admitted as a Fellow of the Royal College of Surgeons in 1850. Originally Clover developed an interest in the field of urology. He practised as a surgeon, inventing two instruments for the crushing and removal of bladder stones. Ill health caused him to give up in 1853 and he turned to general practice.

He then worked as a general practitioner in 1853. He set up his practice at 3 Cavendish Place, London, which became his home until his death in 1882.

After several years in general practice he devoted his practice to anaesthetics, and became "chloroformist" to the University College Hospital, the Westminster Hospital and the London Dental Hospital. Clover's choice of speciality helped to fill the vacancy created by the death of John Snow in 1858.

Clover was probably present at Robert Liston's first operation under ether anaesthesia at University College Hospital in December 1846.

Clover wrote in 1871 that he had given chloroform more than 7000 times, in addition to other anaesthetics in another 4000 cases, without a fatality. However, he lost a patient to chloroform under his hands in 1874, in a case which he described in the British Medical Journal.

== Important cases ==
Because of his expertise in anaesthesia, Clover was often sought out when important figures required surgery. He gave chloroform to Napoleon III, the deposed French Emperor, on 2 January 1873, at Chislehurst, Kent, and again on 6 January, for a procedure to break up a bladder stone. The Emperor died on 9 January. Clover was a signatory to his autopsy report, together with five other physicians.

Clover gave chloroform to Alexandra, Princess of Wales, in 1867, for the removal of a splint from a rheumatic knee, and later anaesthetised her husband Prince Albert Edward in 1877, for an operation to drain an abscess which was attributed to a hunting injury.

Clover also administered general anaesthesia to Sir Robert Peel, Florence Nightingale and Sir Erasmus Wilson.

== Apparatus ==
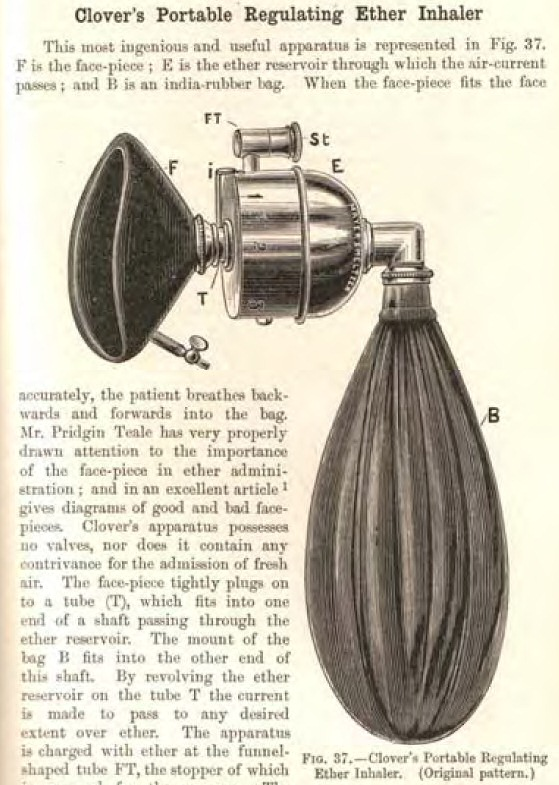
Victorian journal illustration of Clover's portable regulating ether inhaler of 1877, showing 'This most ingenious and useful apparatus'.

During his lifetime, Clover invented and improved a variety of pieces of medical apparatus, especially those for easier and safer anaesthesia. Some of these inventions bore his name, including:

=== Clover's chloroform apparatus ===
Clover's chloroform apparatus was invented in 1862. Chloroform, being much more potent than ether, was much easier to give in overdose. At a time when the anaesthetist was often an untrained assistant, many deaths occurred through accidental overdose. Clover's solution was a large reservoir bag of known capacity, lined with goldbeater's skin to make it airtight, into which a measured volume of chloroform liquid was placed. Inflating the bag to its capacity with a bellows provided a known, accurate and constant concentration of chloroform vapour in air, making delivery safer and more controllable. A vaporiser was no longer necessary, but the bag was large and cumbersome.

A dose of 20 minims (1.18 millilitres) of chloroform per 1000 cubic inches (16.38 litres) of air would provide a concentration of chloroform vapour of 2.25%. 30 minims (1.77ml) would give 3.37%, and 40 minims (2.36ml) would give 4.5%, which Clover believed was the maximum safe concentration.

Many photographs of Clover, heavily bearded, depict his chloroform apparatus slung over his shoulder.

=== Clover's ether inhaler ===
Clover invented his portable ether inhaler in 1877. It was much admired at the time and modified in various ways. It became a common practice at hospitals to initiate all anaesthetic treatments with a mild flow of nitrous oxide and then gradually increase the anaesthesia with a stronger ether or chloroform. Clover's gas-ether inhaler was designed to supply the patient with nitrous oxide and ether at the same time, with the exact mixture being controlled by the operator of the device. It remained in use by many hospitals until the 1930s.

=== Clover's crutch ===
Clover's crutch was a device for maintaining the patient in the lithotomy position.

== Death ==
Clover's health was fragile throughout his life. He died of uraemia aged 57. He is buried in Brompton Cemetery, London. His grave is only 200 yards away from that of fellow anaesthetics innovator, John Snow.

== Posthumous recognition ==
Together with John Snow, Clover is one of the supporters on the crest of the Royal College of Anaesthetists. In 1949, the Royal College of Surgeons established the annual Joseph Clover Lecture in recognition of his contribution to anaesthesia. It was given annually until 1958 and every two years thereafter.

A memorial plaque on the site of his clinic at 3 Cavendish Place, Marylebone, was unveiled on 2 March 1994.

== Bibliography ==
- Duncum, Barbara M., The Development of Inhalation Anaesthesia with Special Reference to the Years 1846–1900, Oxford University Press, 1947. ISBN 978-1-85315-225-2
- Maltby, J.R. Notable Names in Anaesthesia. The Royal Society of Medicine Press, London, 2002. ISBN 1-85315-512-8
- Rushman, G.B., Davies N.J.H., Atkinson, R.S. A Short History of Anaesthesia: the First 150 Years. Butterworth Heinemann, Oxford, 1996. ISBN 0-7506-3066-3
- Sykes, W.S. Essays on the First Hundred Years of Anaesthesia, Volume 2. Churchill Livingstone, Edinburgh, 1960. ISBN 0-443-02866-4
